= Gavar =

City in Gegharkunik, Armenia

Gavar Գավառ Kyavar • Քյավառ
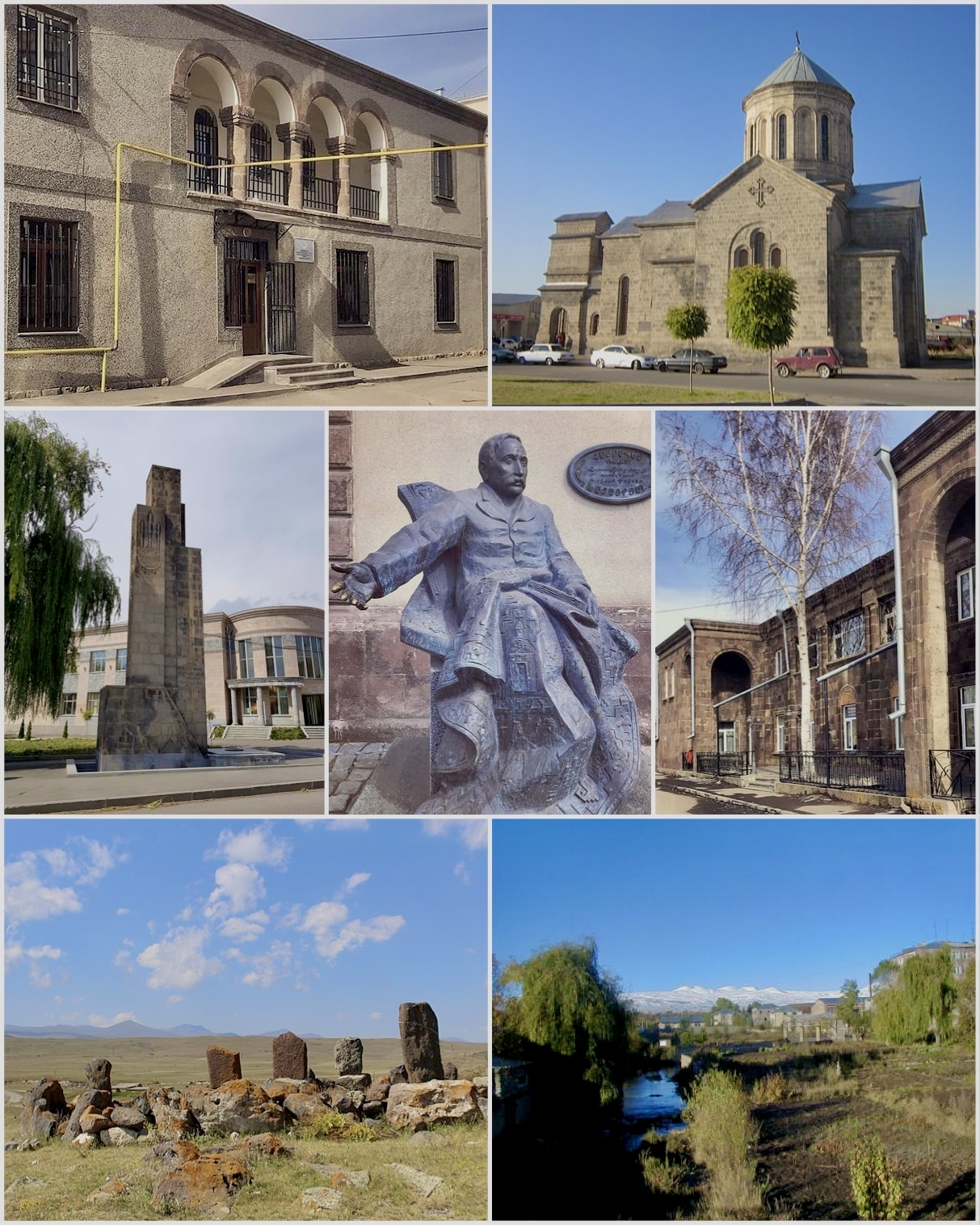
- From top left: Gavar Administration • St. Astvatsatsin Church; WWII Memorial in Downtown Gavar; Hajrapet Khachatryan • Cultural Palace; Manuchar Dolak Khachkars • Gavar mountains

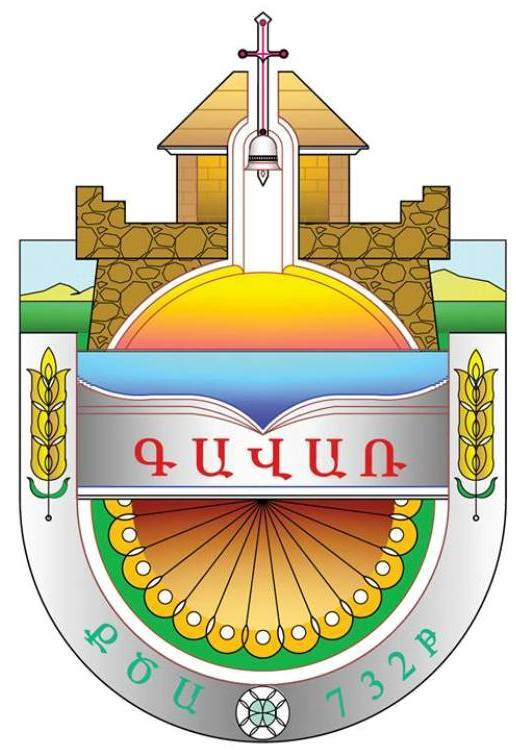
- Seal

- Location within Armenia Location within Gegharkunik
- Coordinates: 40°21′32″N 45°07′36″E
- Country: Armenia
- Province: Gegharkunik
- Municipality: Gavar
- Founded City status: 1830; 1850

Area
  - Total: 16 km^{2} (6.2 sq mi)
- Elevation: 1,982 m (6,503 ft)

Population (2022 census)
  - Total: 17,741
  - Density: 1,100/km^{2} (2,900/sq mi)
- Time zone: UTC+4 (AMT)
- Postal code: 1201-1205
- Area code: (+374) 264
- Vehicle registration: 02

Gavar (Armenian: Գավառ [ɡɑˈvɑr]) is a town in Armenia serving as the administrative centre of the Gavar Municipality and the Gegharkunik Province. It is situated among the high mountains of Gegham range to the west of Lake Sevan, with an average height of 1982 meters above sea level. Located 98 kilometers east of the capital Yerevan, the town had a population of 20,765 as per the 2011 census. As per the 2022 census, the population of Gavar is 17,741.

Gavar is the seat of the Diocese of Gegharkounik of the Armenian Apostolic Church.

== Etymology ==
The town was known as Nor Bayаzet (Նոր Բայազետ) or Novo-Bayazet (Russian: Новобаязет) until 1959, named after the Western Armenian town of Bayazet (historically known as Daroynk and Arshakavan). Between 1959 and 1995, the town was known as Kamo, named after the Bolshevik revolutionary Kamo (Simon Ter-Petrosian). On December 4, 1995, the town was renamed back to its ancient name of Gavar, meaning county in the Armenian language.

However, Gavar is colloquially known as Kyavar (Քյավառ) (Note: Classical spelling: Քեաւառ) since the 19th century.

== History ==
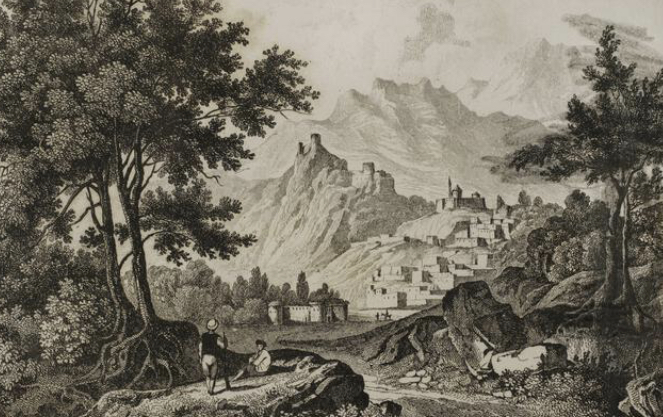
The ancient city of Gavar, 1838 engraving by Vanderbuch

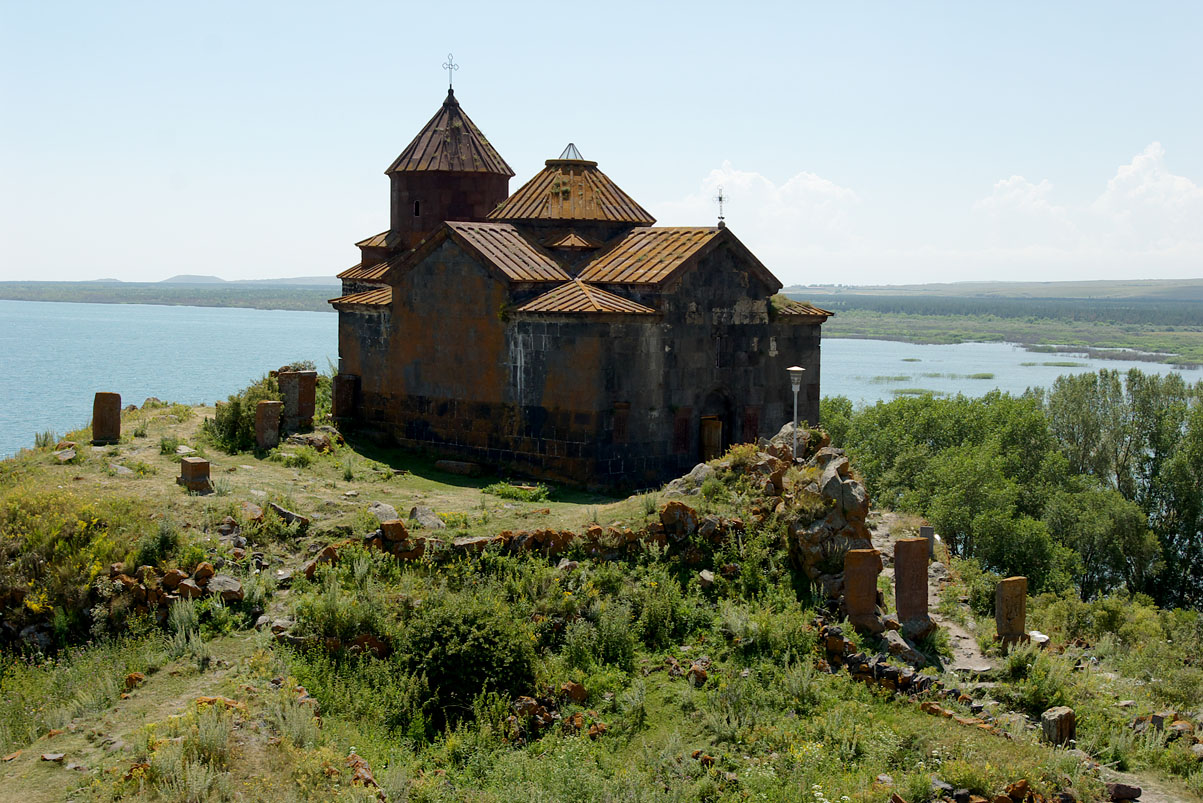
Hayravank Monastery near Gavar

The modern town of Gavar was founded as Novo-Bayazet (New Bayazit) in 1830 around 8 km (5.0 mi) west of the Lake Sevan, on the site of the ancient city of Gavar or Gyavar, following the immigration of 8,557 Armenians from the town of Bayazit (historically known as Daroynk and Arshakavan) of the Ottoman Empire due to the Russo-Turkish war of 1828-1829. The settlement achieved the status of a town in 1850.

However, the area of modern-day Gavar has been inhabited since the Bronze Age. Many historical tombstones, dating back to the 2nd millennium BC are founded in Gavar. The remains of a cyclopean fort dating back to the early Iron Age, are found on a hill at the centre of the town. It is believed that the fortress was the royal capital of the Uelikuhi region within the Urartu kingdom. It was surrounded with more than 22 minor fortifications. The region of Uelikuhi was conquered by the Urartian king Sarduri II. His son, Rusa II renamed the fortress in honour of Khaldi; one of the three chief deities of Ararat. Gavar was known as the “City of Khaldi” while the nearby village of Tsovinar was known as the “City of Teisheba.” Urartian cuneiform inscriptions of Rusa II commemorating his victory over the kings of Uelikuhi and establishing the fortress of Khaldi in 732 BC were discovered in 1927, and are now held in the city’s history museum. The Artsvakar neighbourhood of Gavar is also home to another Iron Age fortress, dating back to the 2nd millennium BC.

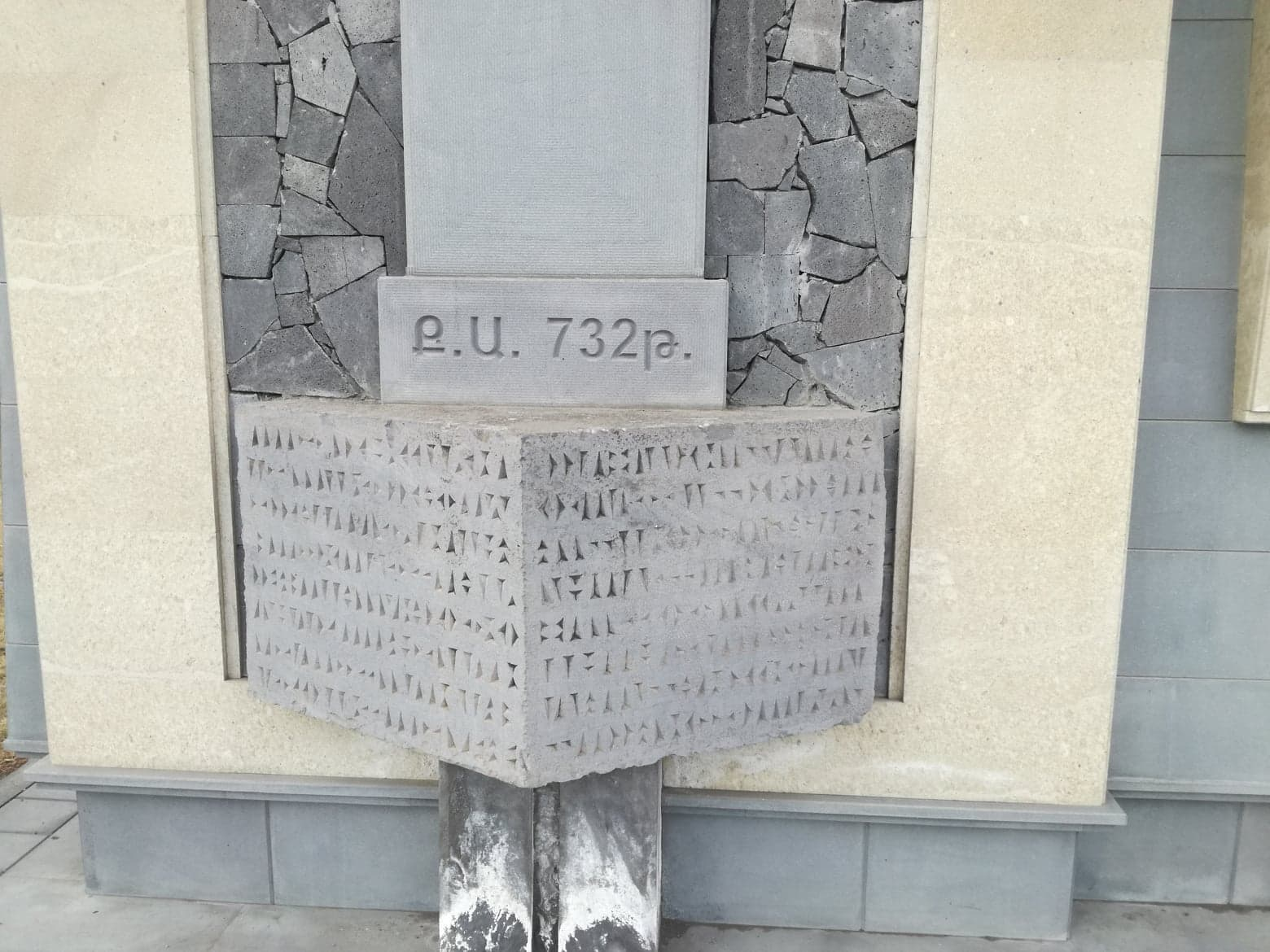
Cuneiform inscription marking the foundation of the ancient fortress city of Khaldi in Gavar

After the establishment of the ancient Kingdom of Armenia, the territory of modern-day Gavar was included within the Gegharkunik canton at the north of the historic Syunik province of Armenia Major.

Many other ancient and medieval monuments, including monasteries, Khachkars (cross-stones), cuneiform inscriptions, gravestones and a chapel are also found in the town. The Hatsarat neighbourhood (a separate village until the 1960s) is home to the Hatsarat Monastery with 2 churches dating back to the 7th and 19th centuries.

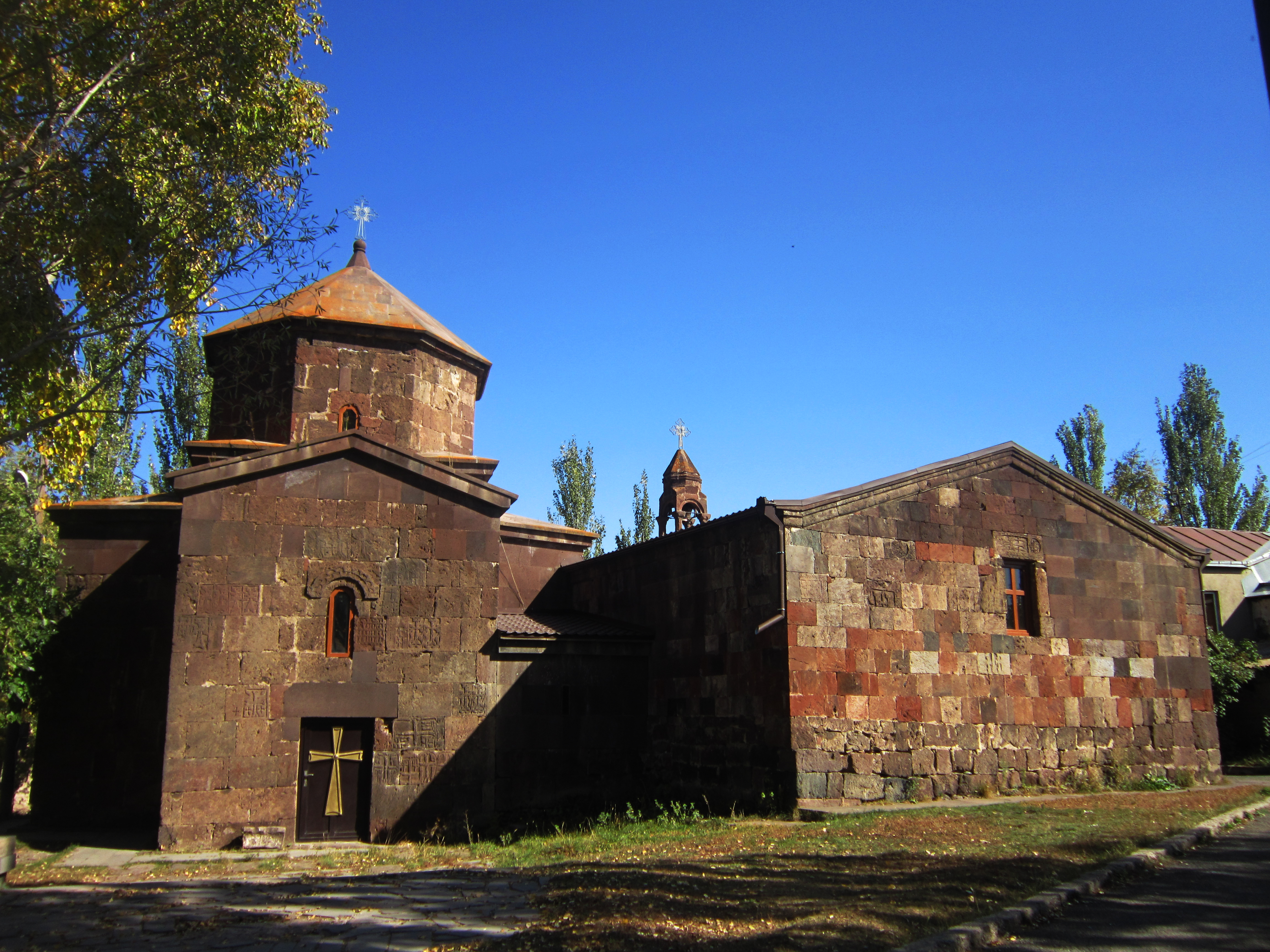
7th century Hatsarat Monastery

Over the centuries, the area of modern-day Gavar had been severely destroyed, with the latest taking place during the 17th century, when it was ruined by Shah Abbas I of Persia.

In 1828, after the Russo-Persian War, the region of Gegharkunik—as a part of the Erivan Khanate—was handed over to the Russian Empire as a result of the Treaty of Turkmenchay signed on 21 February 1828. In 1830, the Armenian migrants from Bayazit founded the village of Novo-Bayazet. With the establishment of the Erivan Governorate in 1850, Novo-Bayazet became the centre of the newly formed Nor Bayazet uezd.

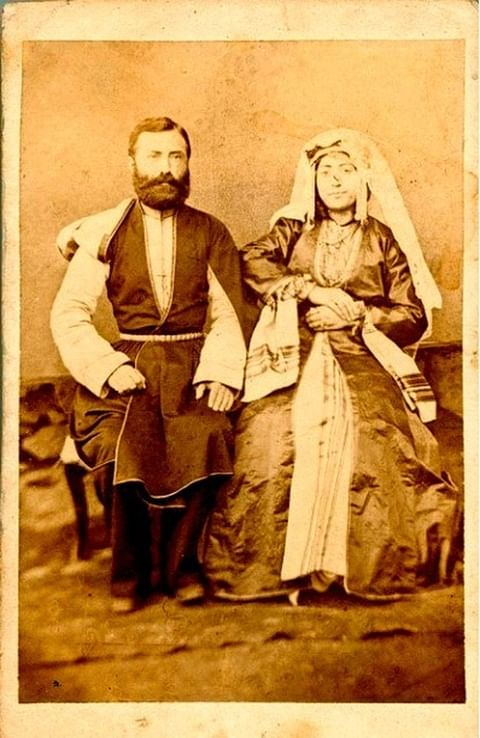
Prince Mkrtich Artsruni with his wife Srbuhi in Gavar

Novo-Bayazet, along with many other regions of Eastern Armenia became part of the USSR in December 1920. After achieving the status of an urban-type settlement in 1950, the town has gradually grown over the years. In 1959, the town was known as Kamo, named after the Bolshevik revolutionary Kamo. It was once home to 36,400 people at the beginning of the 1980s.

After the independence of Armenia in, the town was renamed Gavar in 1995 and became the provincial centre of the newly established Gegharkunik Province. However, much of the Soviet-era infrastructure of the town has failed and the industrial capacity has floundered. As a result, the population of Gavar has drastically declined to 23,302 as reported in the 2001 census, 20,765 in the 2011 census and later to 17,741 as reported in the 2022 census.

== Geography and climate ==
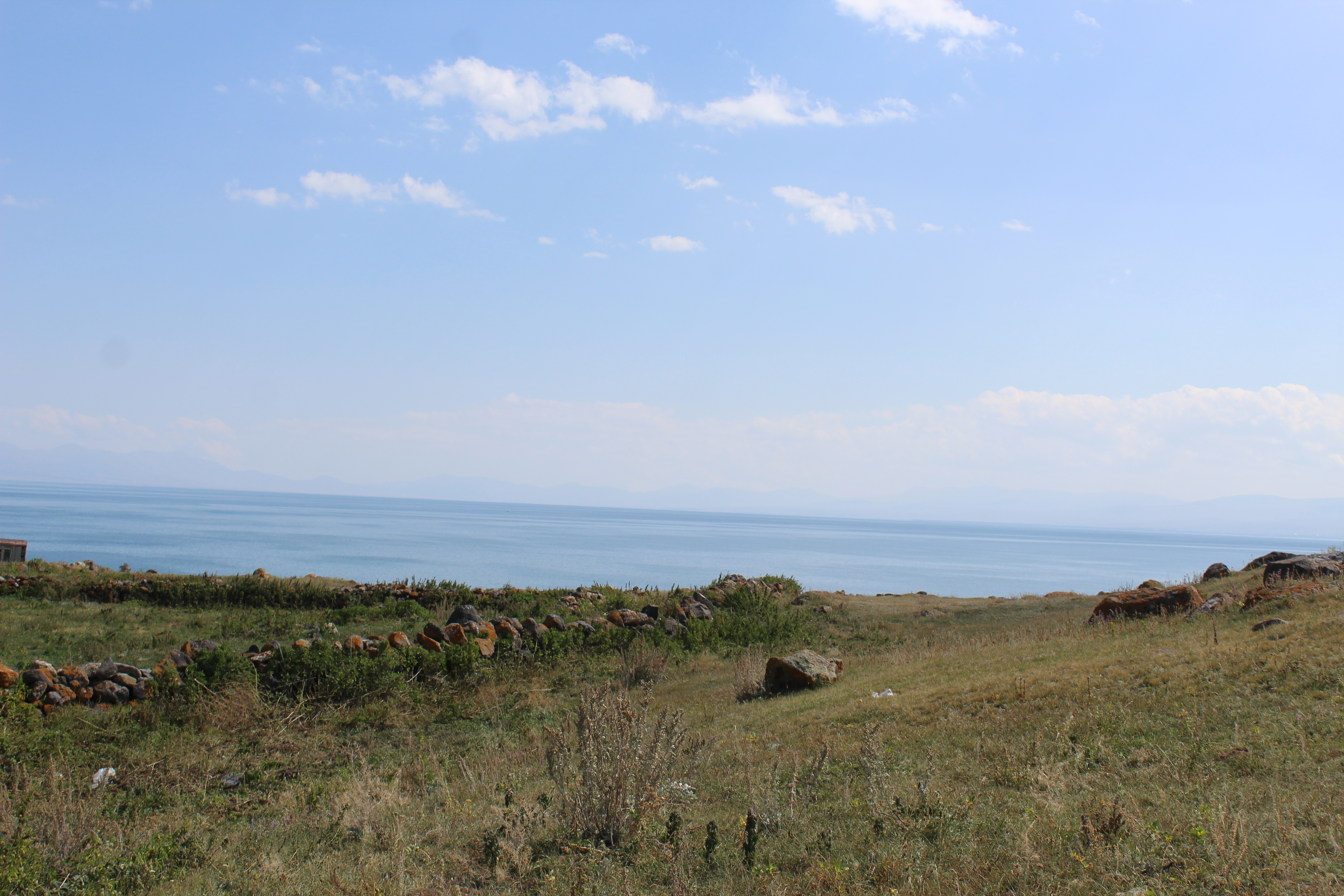
Gavar landscape and Lake Sevan

At an average height of 1982 meters above sea level, Gavar is situated on the shores of Gavaraget river. The town is dominated by the Gegham mountains from the west and the Lake Sevan from the east. At a height of 3,597 meters, mount Azhdahak is located around 15 km southwest of Gavar.

The town is surrounded by a number of villages including Noratus from the east, Karmirgyugh and Gandzak from the south.

=== Climate ===
Gavar features a humid continental (Köppen Dfb) climate, which is characterized by cold winters and warm summers. The annual precipitation level is 450 mm.

Climate data for Gavar 1961 m asl (1991–2020 normals, extremes 1981-2020)
Month	Jan	Feb	Mar	Apr	May	Jun	Jul	Aug	Sep	Oct	Nov	Dec	Year
Record high °C (°F)	10.6 (51.1)	11.9 (53.4)	18.6 (65.5)	25.1 (77.2)	27.6 (81.7)	30.5 (86.9)	32.7 (90.9)	34.1 (93.4)	31.1 (88.0)	24.5 (76.1)	20.6 (69.1)	14.0 (57.2)	34.1 (93.4)
Mean daily maximum °C (°F)	−0.6 (30.9)	−0.3 (31.5)	3.4 (38.1)	10.7 (51.3)	15.4 (59.7)	19.7 (67.5)	22.8 (73.0)	23.1 (73.6)	20.3 (68.5)	14.0 (57.2)	7.0 (44.6)	1.3 (34.3)	11.4 (52.5)
Daily mean °C (°F)	−6.3 (20.7)	−6.1 (21.0)	−1.8 (28.8)	5.3 (41.5)	9.5 (49.1)	13.2 (55.8)	16.3 (61.3)	16.4 (61.5)	12.7 (54.9)	7.5 (45.5)	1.5 (34.7)	−4.0 (24.8)	5.4 (41.6)
Mean daily minimum °C (°F)	−11.9 (10.6)	−11.9 (10.6)	−7.0 (19.4)	−0.2 (31.6)	3.5 (38.3)	6.6 (43.9)	9.7 (49.5)	9.7 (49.5)	5.1 (41.2)	1.0 (33.8)	−4.1 (24.6)	−9.4 (15.1)	−0.7 (30.7)
Record low °C (°F)	−33 (−27)	−32.7 (−26.9)	−30.9 (−23.6)	−22.2 (−8.0)	−15.2 (4.6)	−4.8 (23.4)	−3.1 (26.4)	−2.2 (28.0)	−5.8 (21.6)	−21.2 (−6.2)	−27.2 (−17.0)	−27.6 (−17.7)	−33 (−27)
Average precipitation mm (inches)	22.7 (0.89)	26.0 (1.02)	38.9 (1.53)	54.5 (2.15)	66.4 (2.61)	74.8 (2.94)	67.0 (2.64)	43.5 (1.71)	30.5 (1.20)	35.1 (1.38)	25.4 (1.00)	20.6 (0.81)	505.4 (19.88)
Average precipitation days (≥ 1.0 mm)	5	5.7	8.2	10.8	13.3	11.4	9.1	7.4	5.9	7.6	5.5	5.5	95.4
Average relative humidity (%)	73.6	72.2	69.9	68	68.1	68.1	68.5	66.5	67	68.4	70.7	73.5	69.5
Source 1: NCEI
Source 2: Météo Climat stats(Temperature averages for 1981-2010)

== Demographics ==
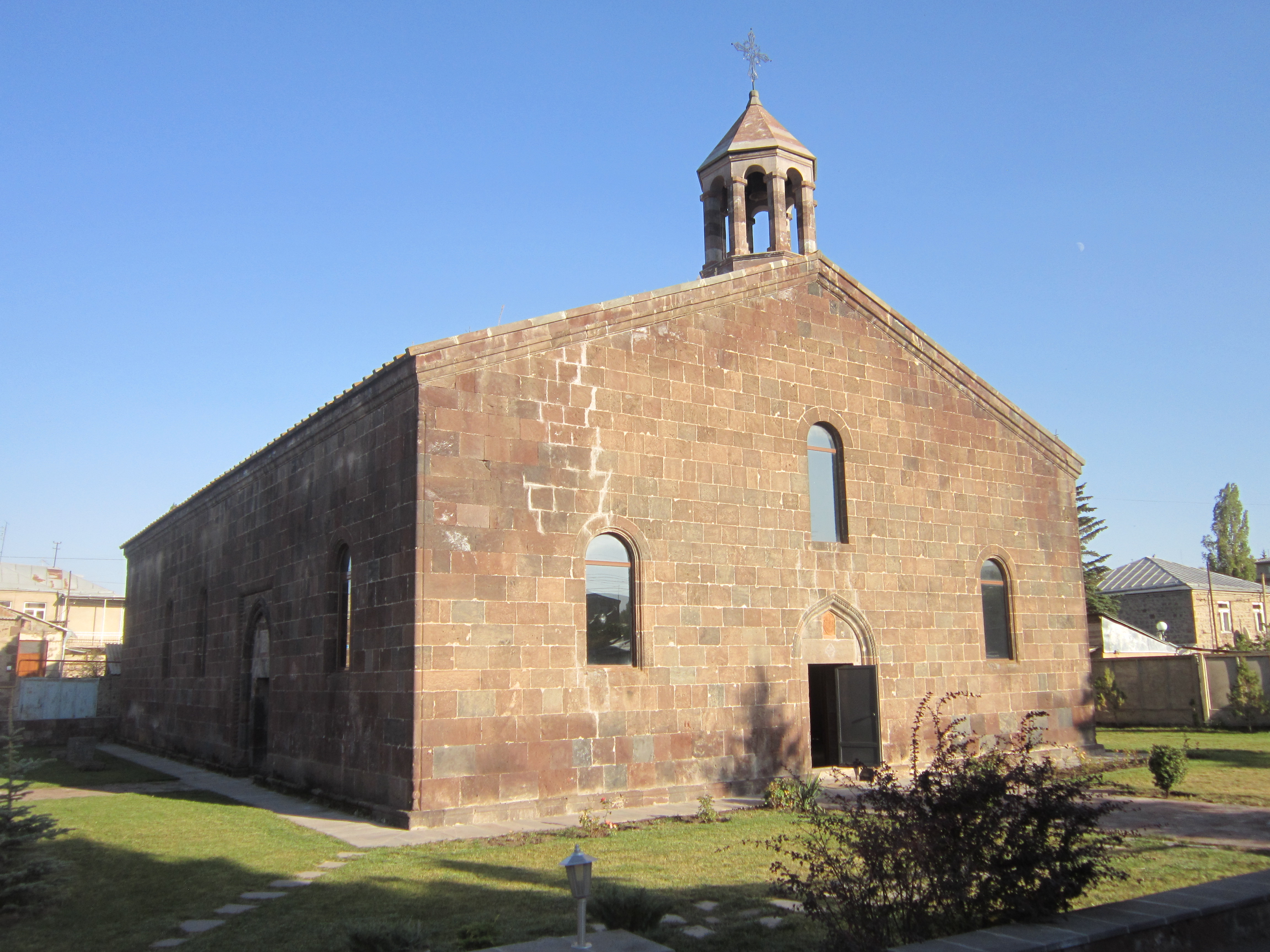
Surp Karapet Church opened in 1848 by Barsegh Artsruni

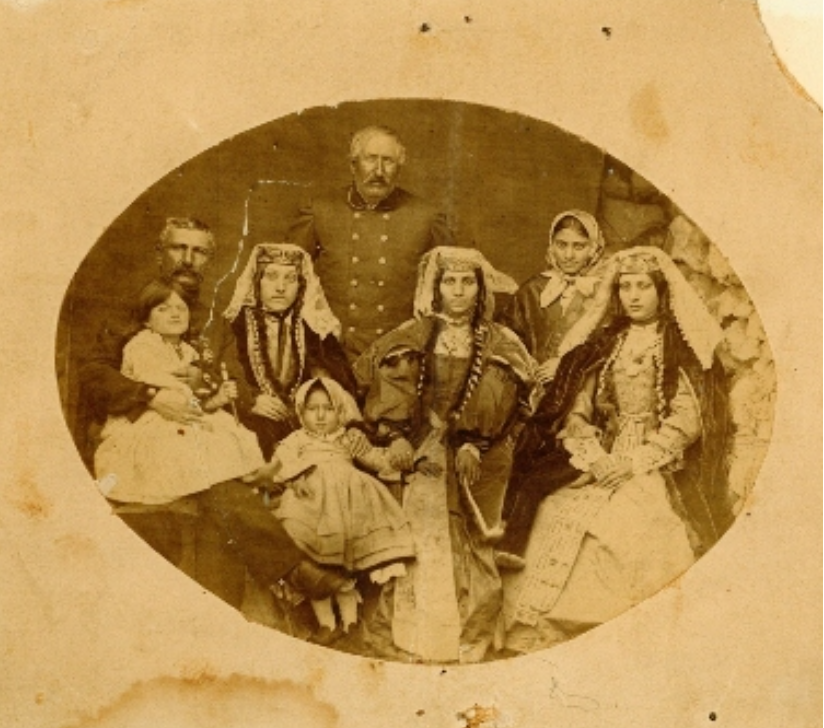
Prince Barsegh Artsruni with his family in Gavar wearing traditional dress, 19th century

Historical population
Year	Pop.	±% p.a.
1831	1,346	—
1897	8,486	+2.83%
1916	14,748	+2.95%
1926	8,447	−5.42%
1939	8,277	−0.16%
1959	8,751	+0.28%
1974	21,382	+6.14%
1989	31,234	+2.56%
2001	26,621	−1.32%
2011	20,765	−2.45%
2022	17,741	−1.42%

=== Religion ===
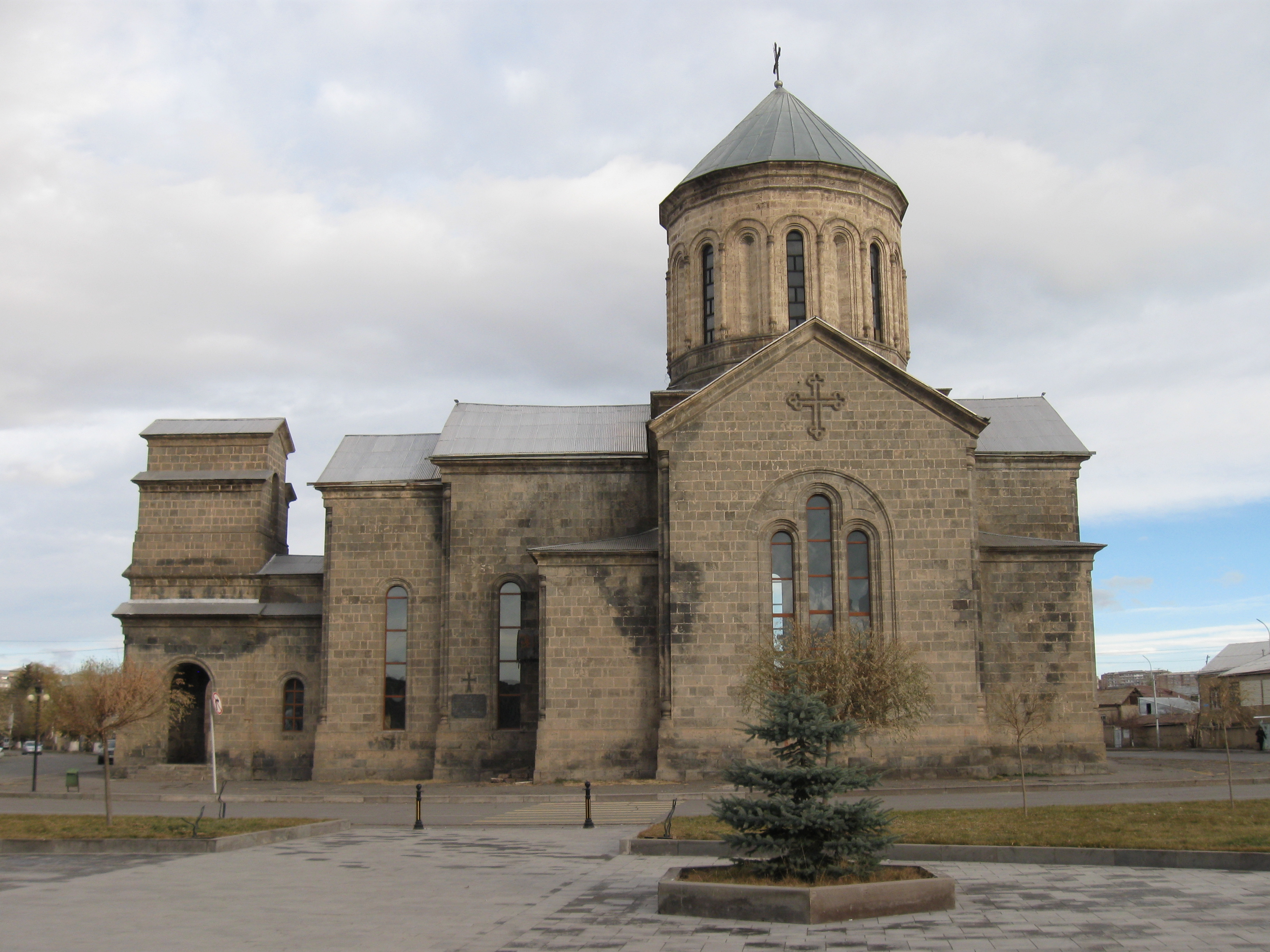

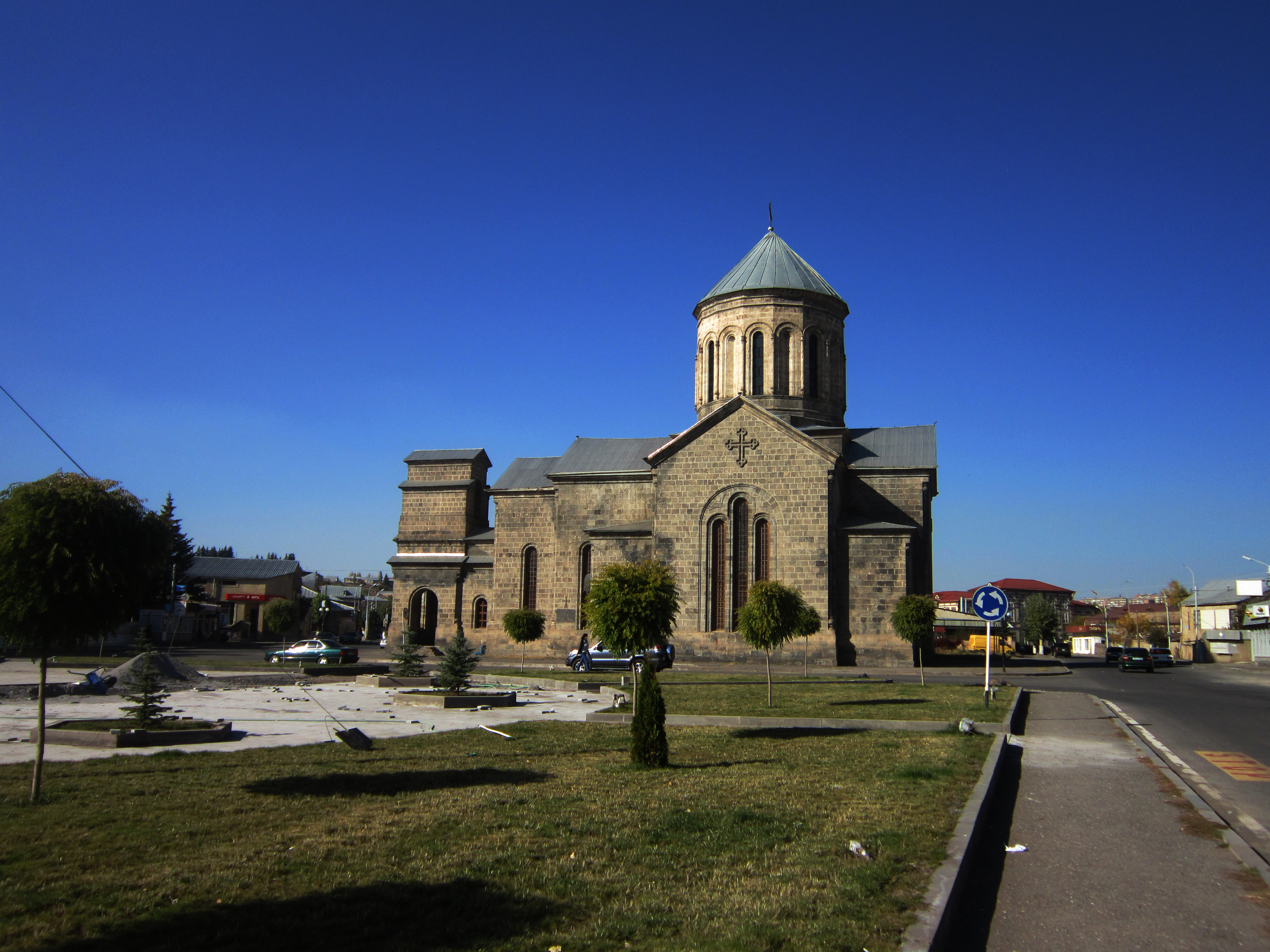
The Holy Mother of God Cathedral opened in 1905, at the centre of Gavar

The people of Gavar are mainly Christians and belong to the Armenian Apostolic Church. The town has many medieval chapels and churches. The Surp Karapet Church of 1848 is among the well-preserved churches in Gavar. The Cathedral of the Holy Mother of God in Gavar is the seat of the Diocese of Gegharkunik of the Armenian Church. It was built in 1905 at the central square of the town, with the efforts of then-bishop Khoren Muradbegian with help of the local citizens. Until the late 1990s, it was the highest church in Armenia in terms of altitudes.

The town is also home to many other churches including:

- Hatsarat Monastery with the churches of the Holy Mother of God (7th century) and Saint Gregory the Illuminator (19th century).
- Hayravank Monastery of the 9th century: located 7 kilometers north of Gavar on the shores of Lake Sevan.
- Surp Khach (Holly Cross) chapel of the 17th century, renovated in 1969.
- Surp Karapet Church built by Barsegh Artsruni in 1848 and entirely renovated in 2012.

The Noratus cemetery archaeological site is located in the Noratus village just 4 kilometers east of Gavar. It is home to a large number of impressive medieval khachkars (cross-stones).

== Culture ==
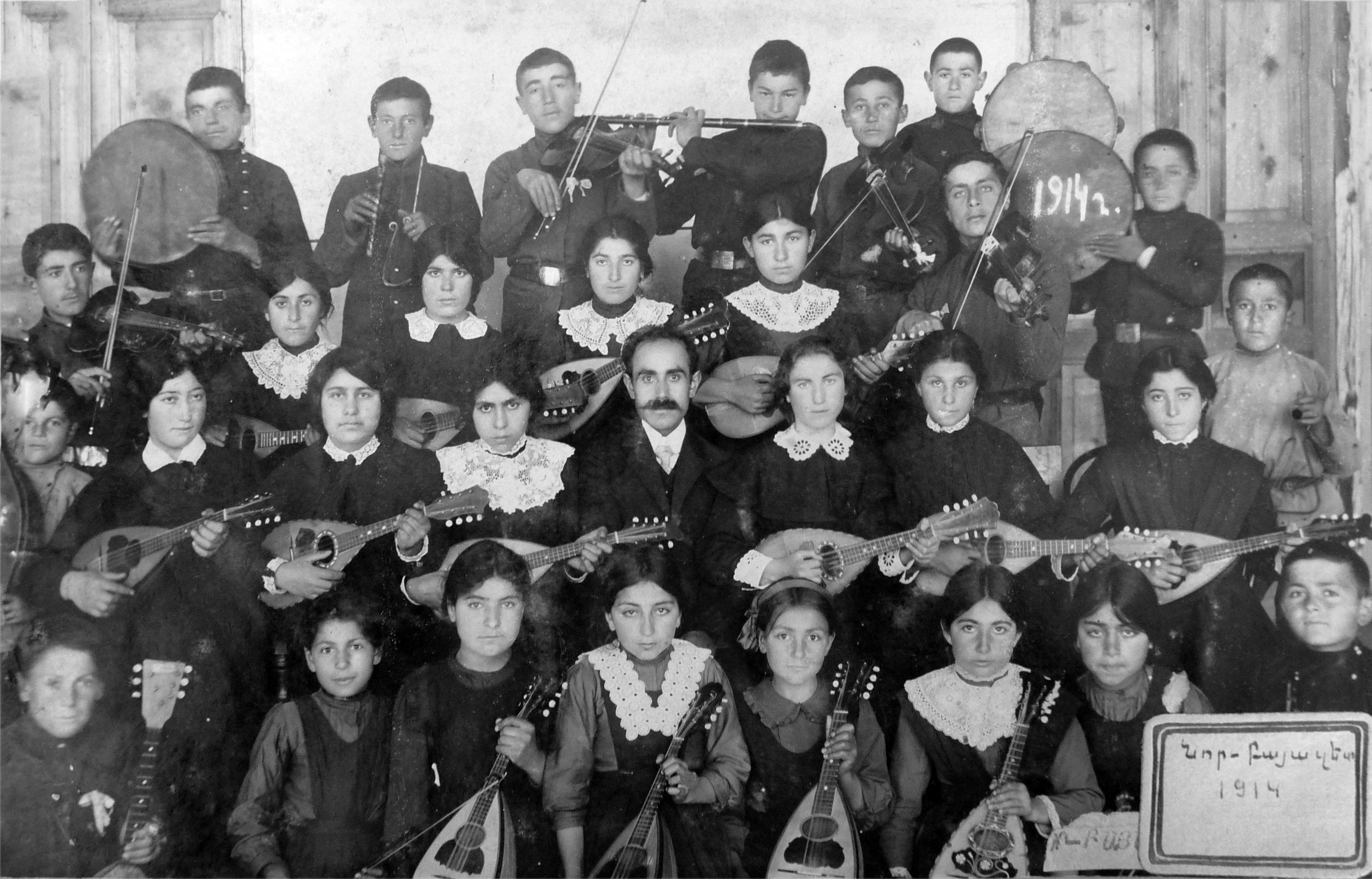
Armenian folk music ensemble in Gavar (Nor-Bayazet) from 1914

Gavar has a history museum, a cultural palace, a drama theatre, many public libraries and monument dedicated to the victims of the Great Patriotic War during World War II.

The town has an educational teaching centre (1923), school of music (1945), palace of culture (1970), school of art (1982), public library (2002), and a special school of duduk named after Gevorg Dabaghyan (2010). The municipality runs a youth creativity centre as well.

Gavar has a portal which is used by many citizens abroad. The name of the portal is Kyavar, as the locals pronounce the name of the city with a "ky" sound instead of a "g" sound at the beginning of the name.

=== Cuisine ===
The cuisine of Gavar is closely related with the oriental cuisine elements, characterized with various spices, vegetables, fish, and fruits combination.

Kyavari Kyufta (kofta of Gavar), the town's most favourite dish, is made from minced meat spiced with onions and rolled into balls before boiling in water. Served in slices, it is garnished with butter. People of Gavar like to eat bread with almost everything, and the two traditional types of bread in Gavar are lavash and matnakash.

The Kyavar baklava is a many-layered pastry with tissue-thin sheets of phyllo dough, filled with nuts and sugar and finished with a dousing of hot honey.

== Transportation ==
Gavar is located on the M-10 Motorway that connects the town with northeastern Armenia. The H-39 Road connects Gavar with the surrounding town and villages.

Gavar has an airstrip since the Soviet years, located to the north of the town.

== Economy ==
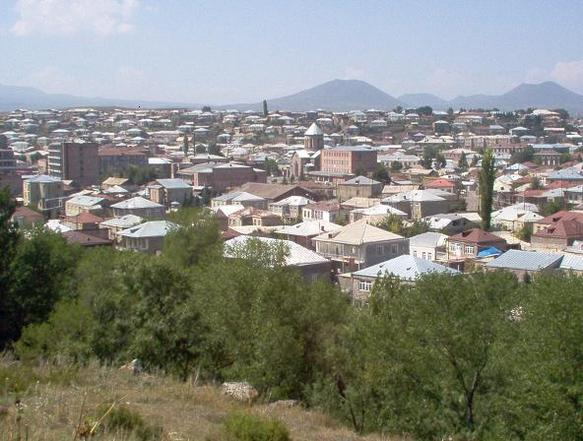
A view of the town

After being granted the status of an urban-type settlement in 1950, the town became one of the major industrial centres of the Armenian SSR. It was home to a large electrical cable factory known as Kamokabel as well as a machines manufacturing plant.

However, after the independence of Armenia in 1991, most of the Soviet-era industry has dreadfully declined. However, the local economy is improving within slow rates as many native businessmen are returning to Gavar from Russia in the hope of finding new chances of investments.

Currently, Gavar is home to the "Gavar Furniture Factory" since 1948, the "Sevan Mineral Water Plant" founded in 1953 (reopened in 2015), the "Aquatic LLC" for processed crayfish founded in 2002, the "Kirakosyan" furniture factory founded in 2006, and the "Shushan Production Cooperative" for soft drinks.

=== Services ===
Gavar has a medical centre, a central hotel known as Khaldi, a local TV station known as Kyavar TV and many branches of local Armenian banks.

== Education ==
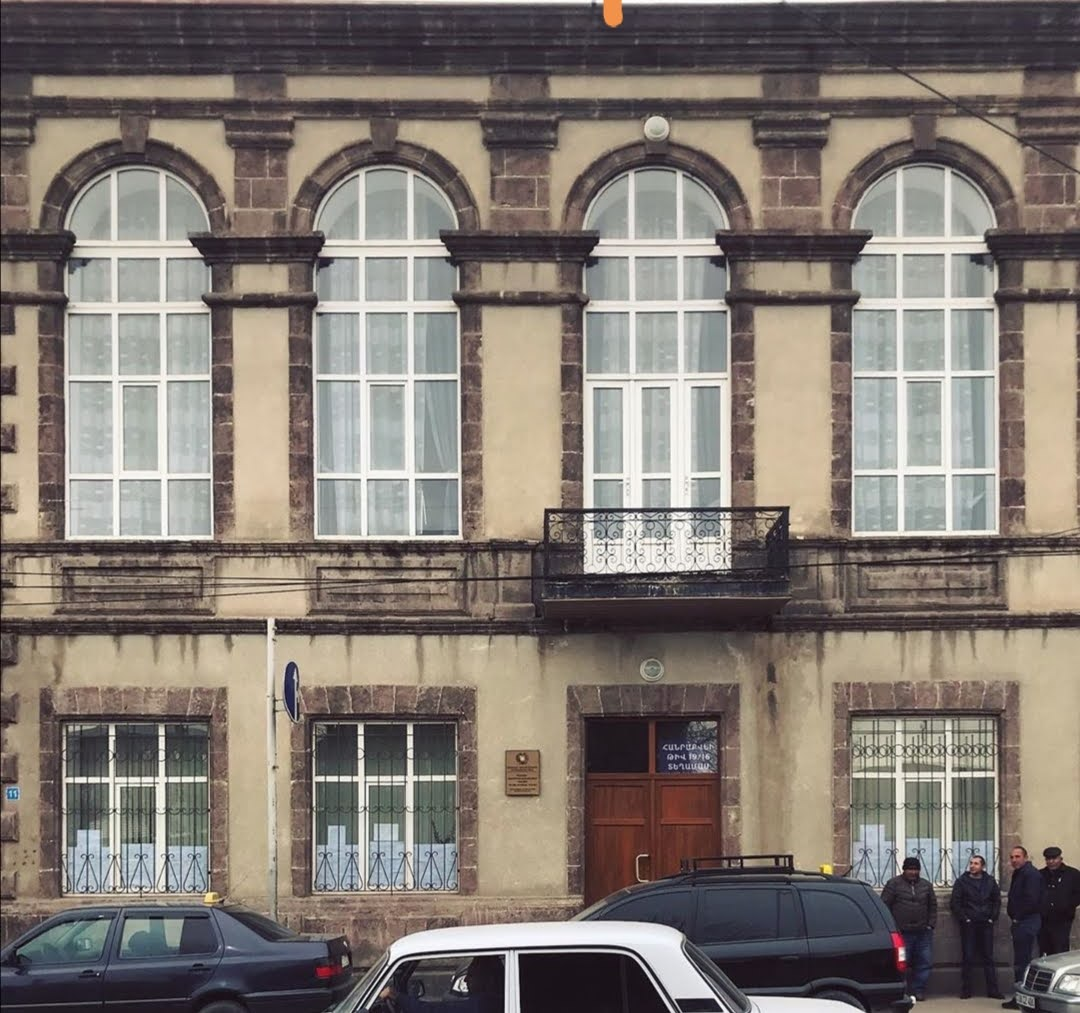
Art school in Gavar

Education continues to be one of the main values in the society of Gavar. A literacy rate of 99% was reported as early as 1960. Nowadays, there are nine public education schools, six nursery schools, four specialized technical intermediate colleges, one sports school, two music and art schools, one special school for children with special educational needs and one university in the town of Gavar.

The Gavar State University was opened in 1993 after the independence of Armenia. With its five faculties the Gavar University is a major educational centre for the entire province of Gegharkunik. The University provides degrees in Philology, Natural Sciences, Humanities, Economics and Education. Nowadays, more than 2,400 students are attending the university.

The Gavar Special School is the only school for mentally and physically handicapped children in the region. It is currently carrying out steps towards improvement and development with the assistance of its partners and sponsors on its way to become a leading institution among the special schools in Armenia.

== Sport ==
Football and chess are popular in the town. The sports school of Gavar was opened in 1971 and currently provides trainings in many team and individual sports, including martial arts, basketball, futsal, boxing, weightlifting, etc.

Hovhannes Goharyan from Gavar, has played as a striker for the Armenia national football team in 2009-10.

In December 2011, the renowned Armenian player Henrikh Mkhitaryan visited the town along with the president of the FFA Ruben Hayrapetyan for charity purposes.

== International relations ==
=== Twin towns – Sister cities ===
Gavar is twinned with:

- Novorossiysk, Russia, since 2009

== Notable people ==
Here are some notable people who were born or raised in the town of Gavar:

- Ivan Gevorkian (1907-1989), Soviet-Armenian surgeon and scientist
- Samvel Kocharyants (1909-1993), Soviet Armenian engineer and developer of the first Soviet nuclear warheads for ballistic missiles.
- Frunze Dovlatyan (1927–1997), film director, actor and screenwriter
- Hranush Hakobyan (1954-), politician and current minister of diaspora
- Hovhannes Goharyan, former professional football player
- Heghine Rapyan, pianist

== Gallery ==
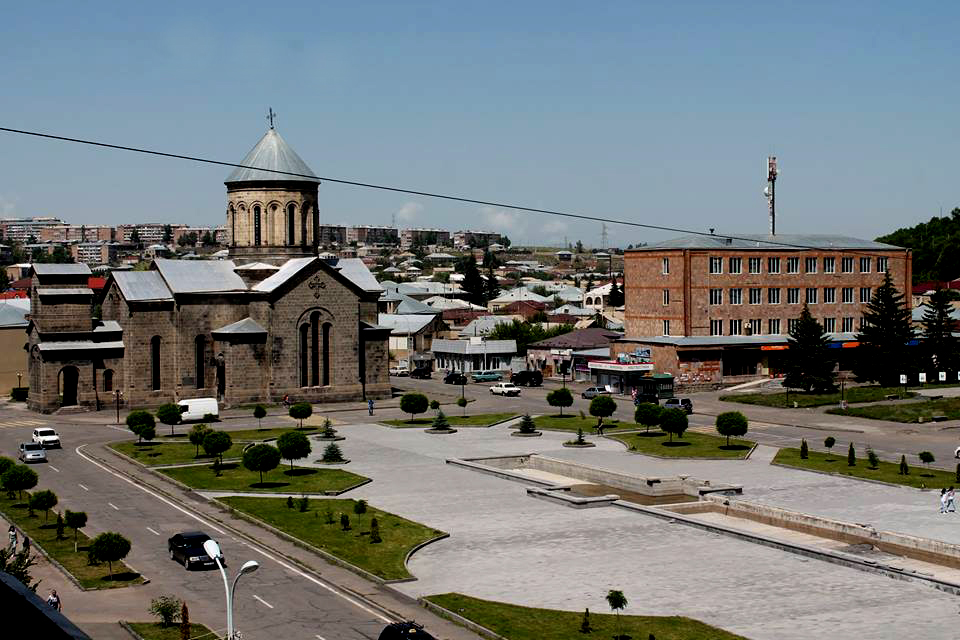

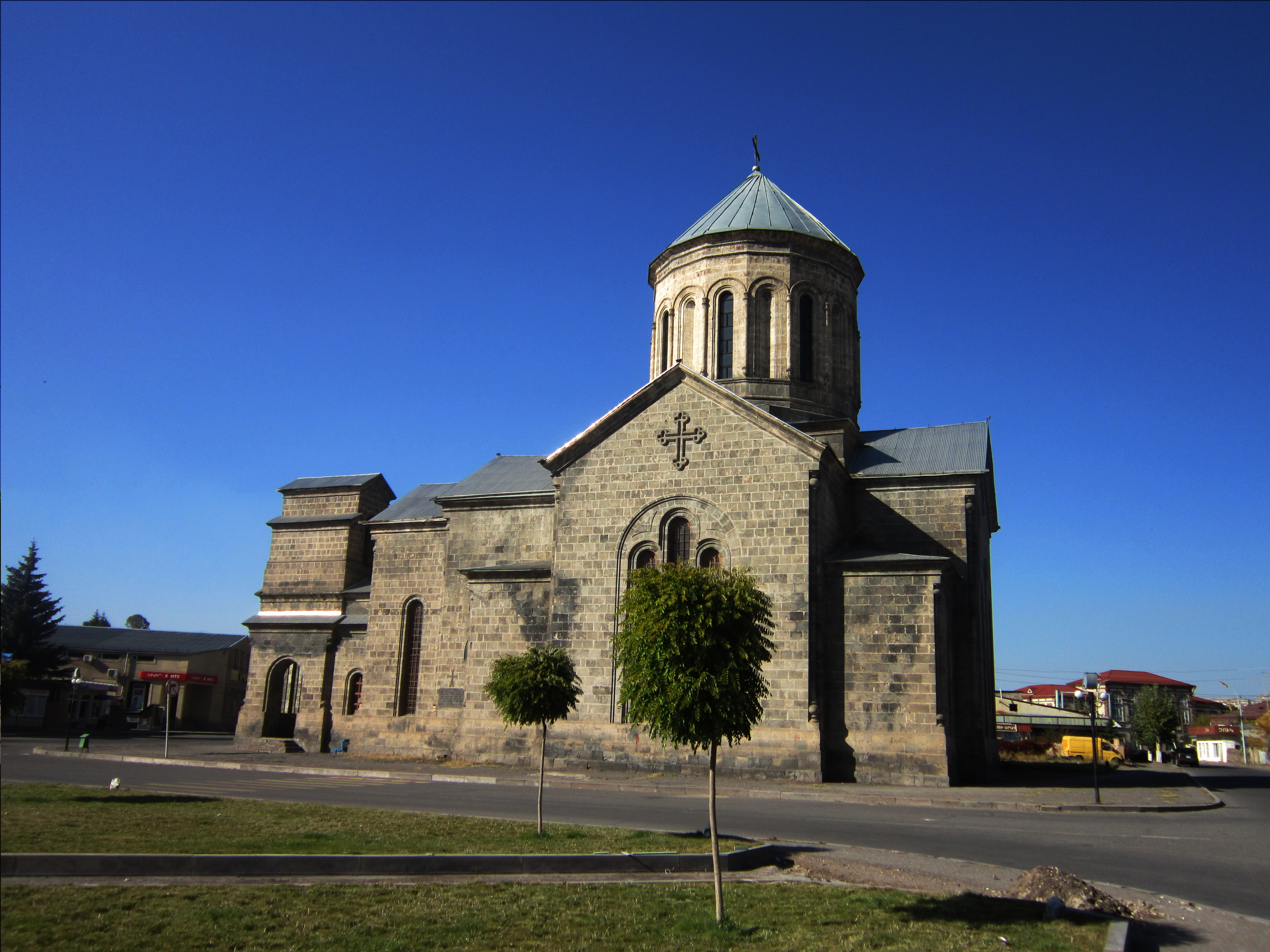

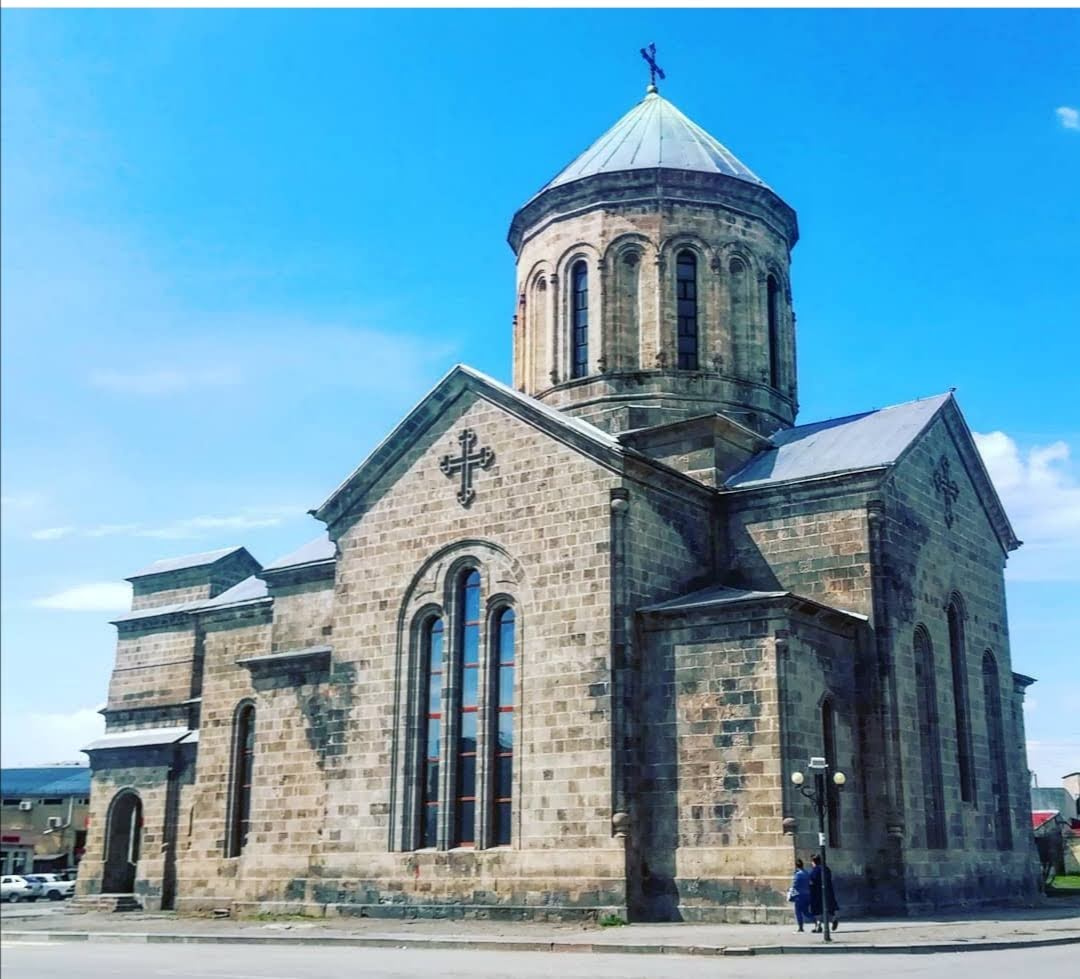

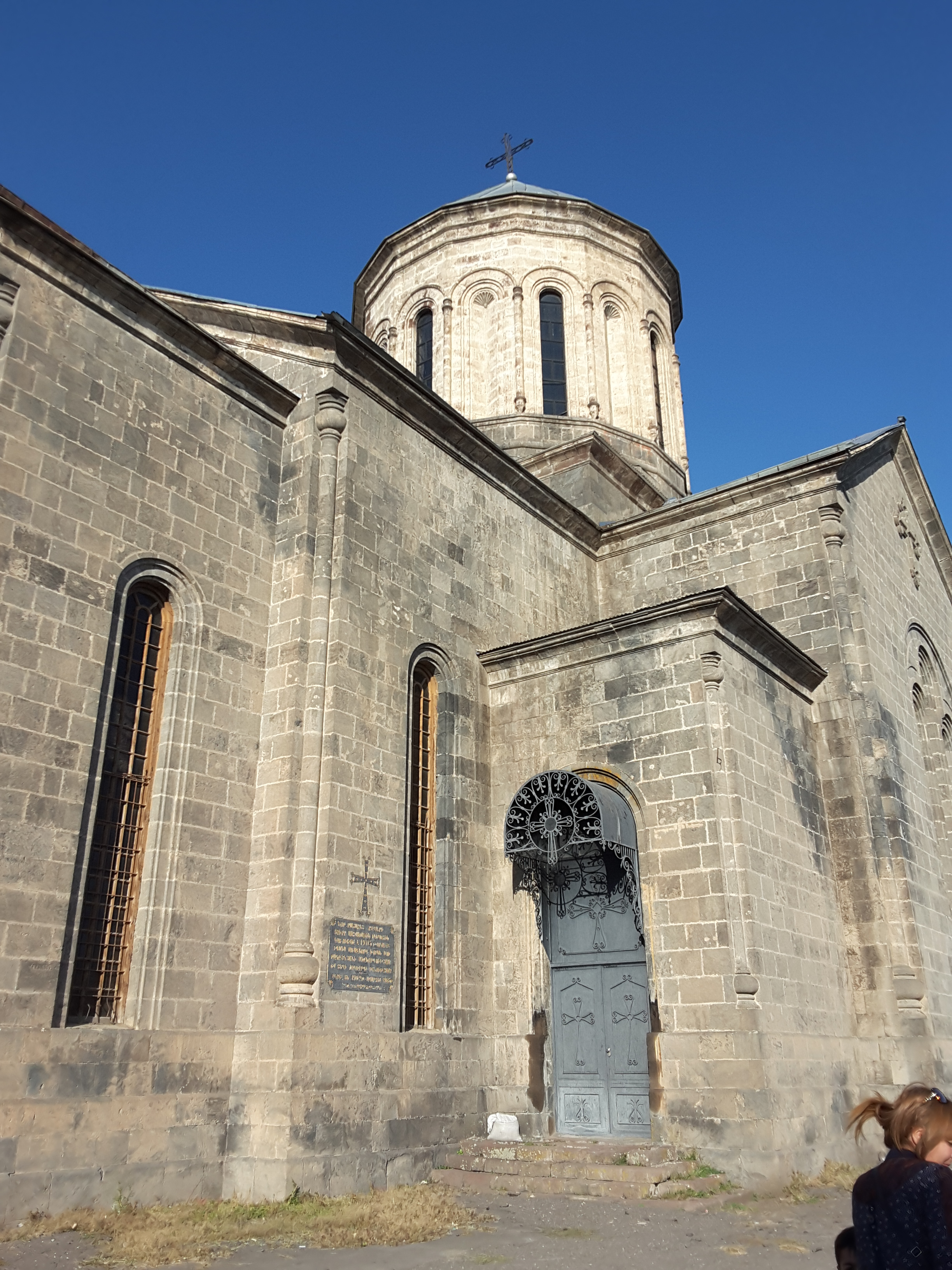

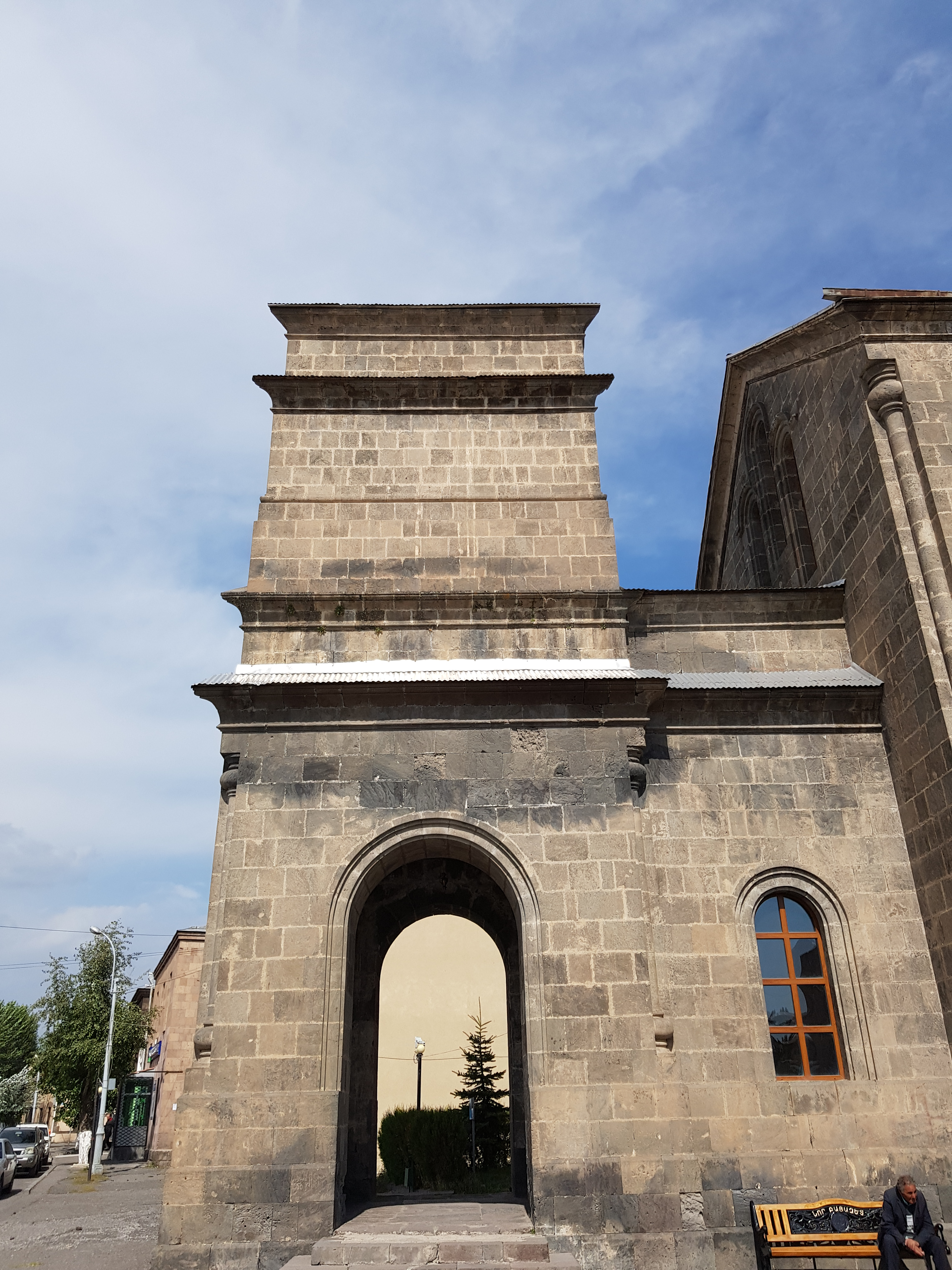

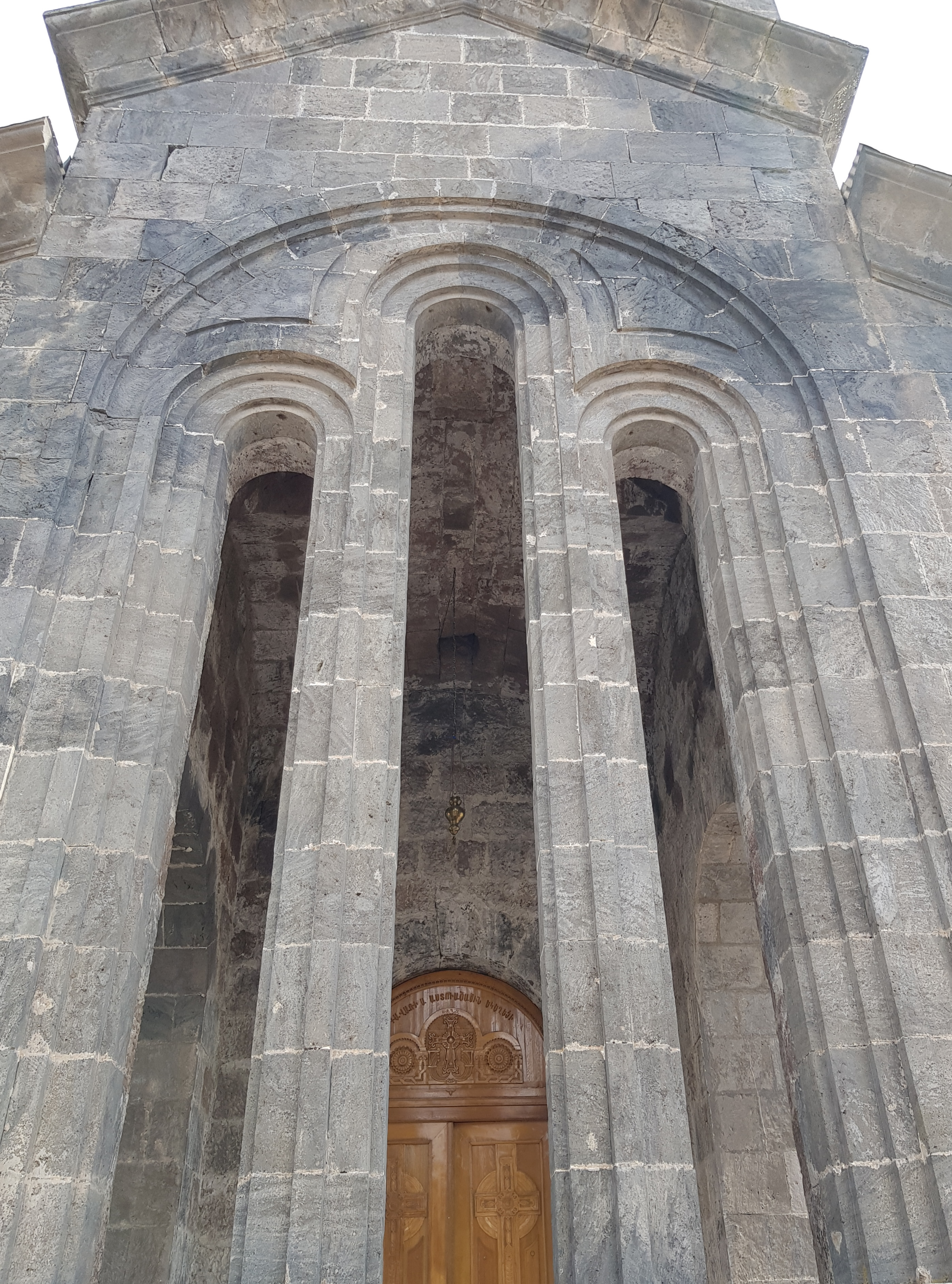

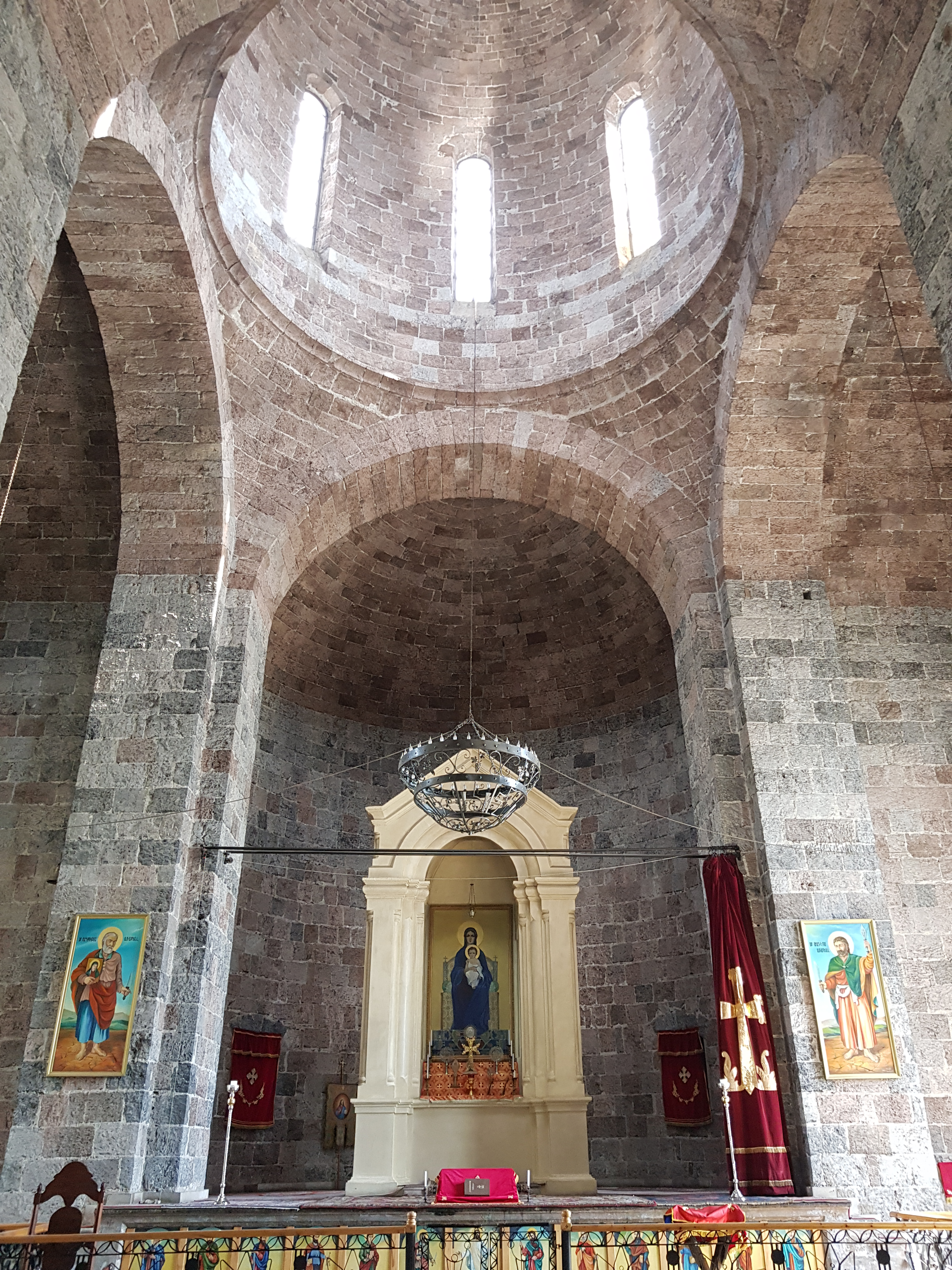

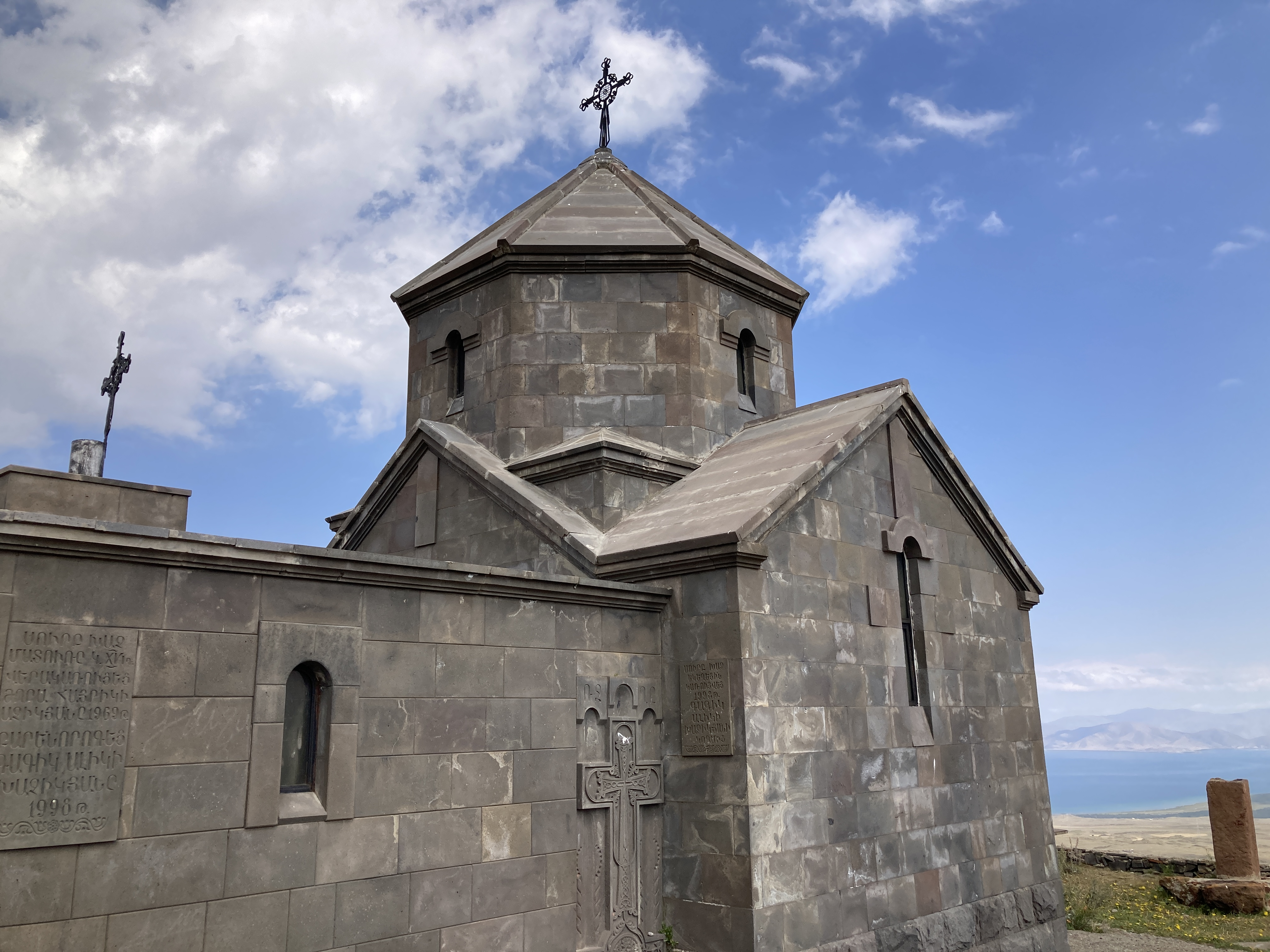

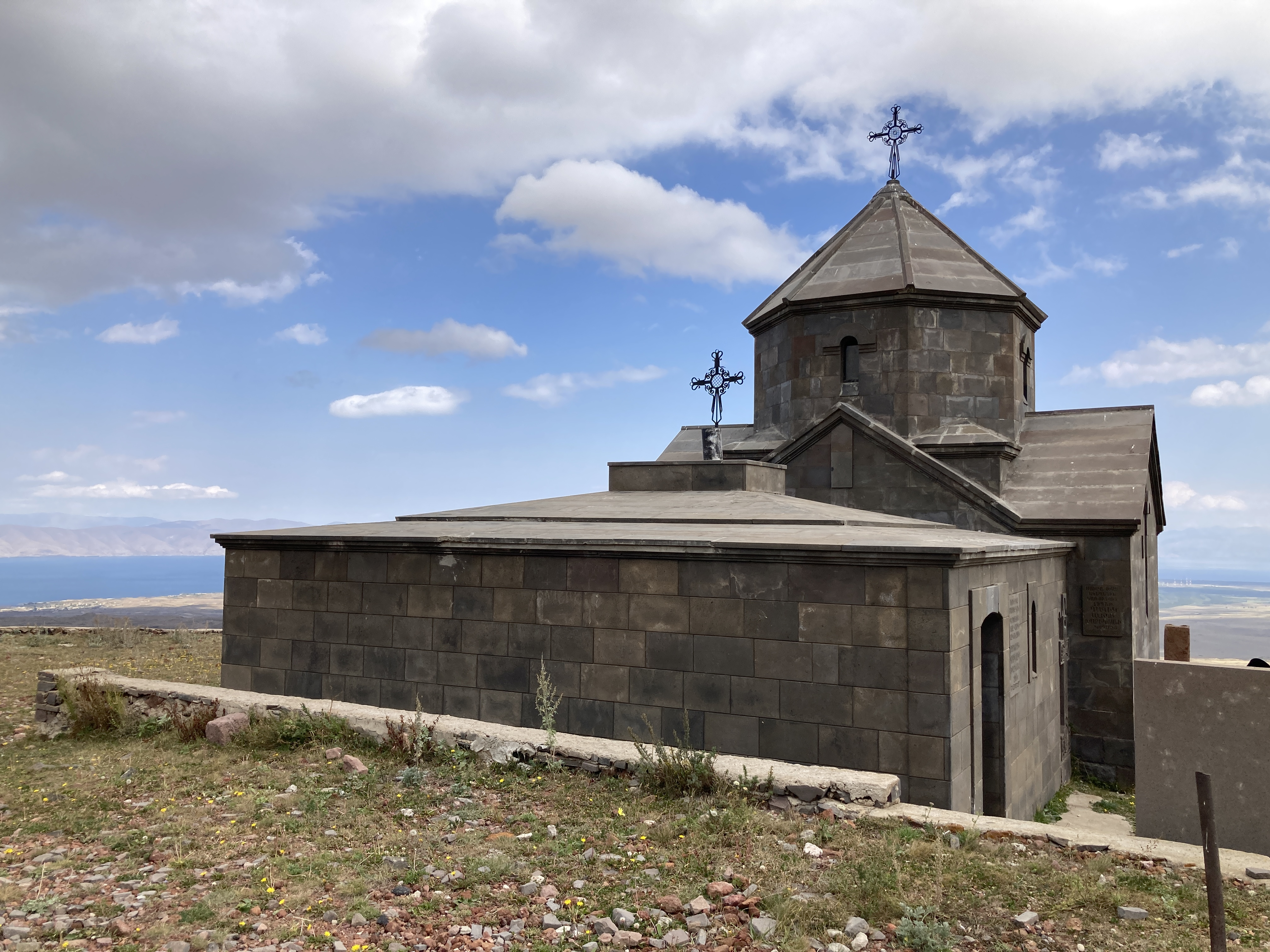

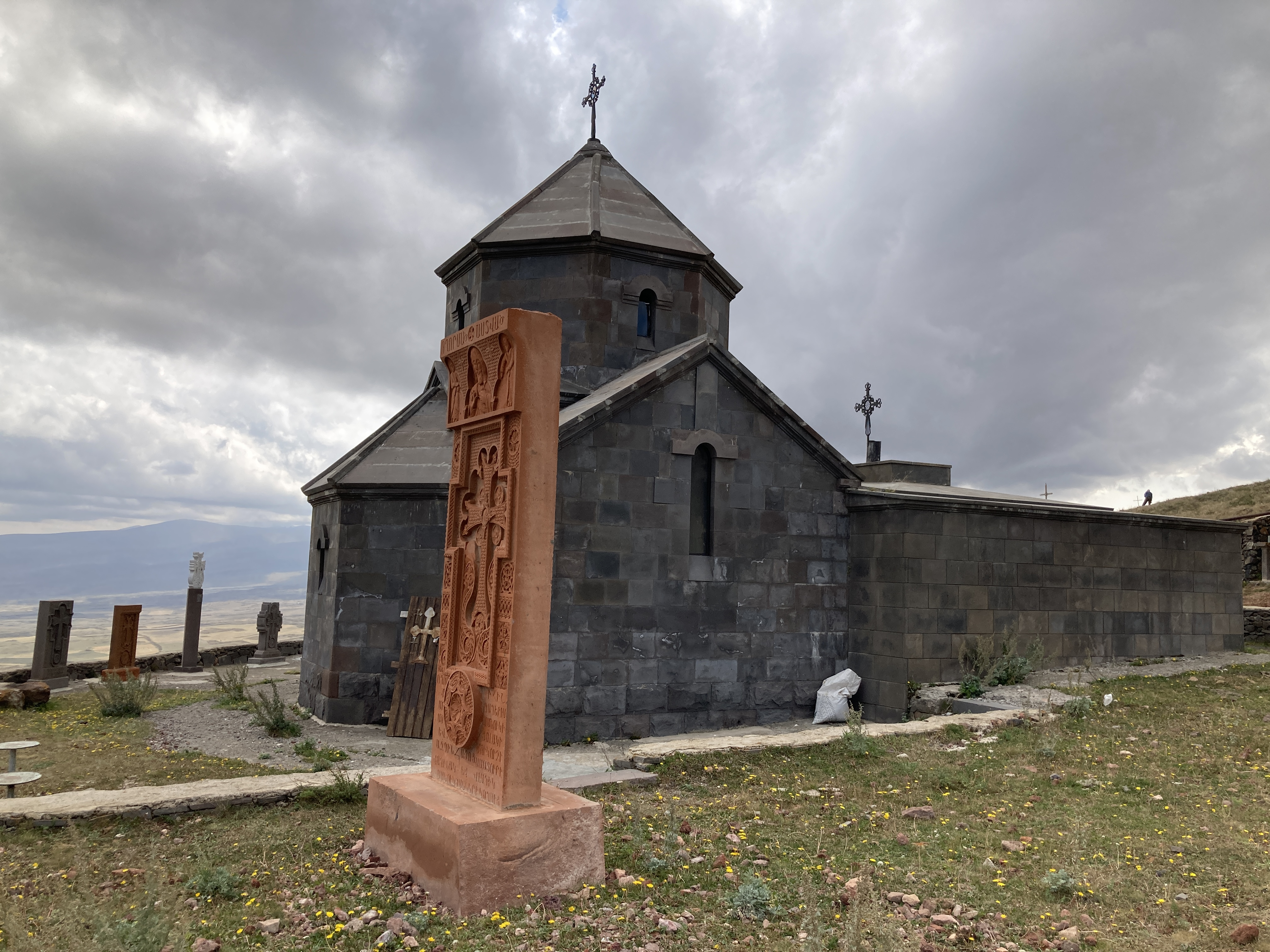

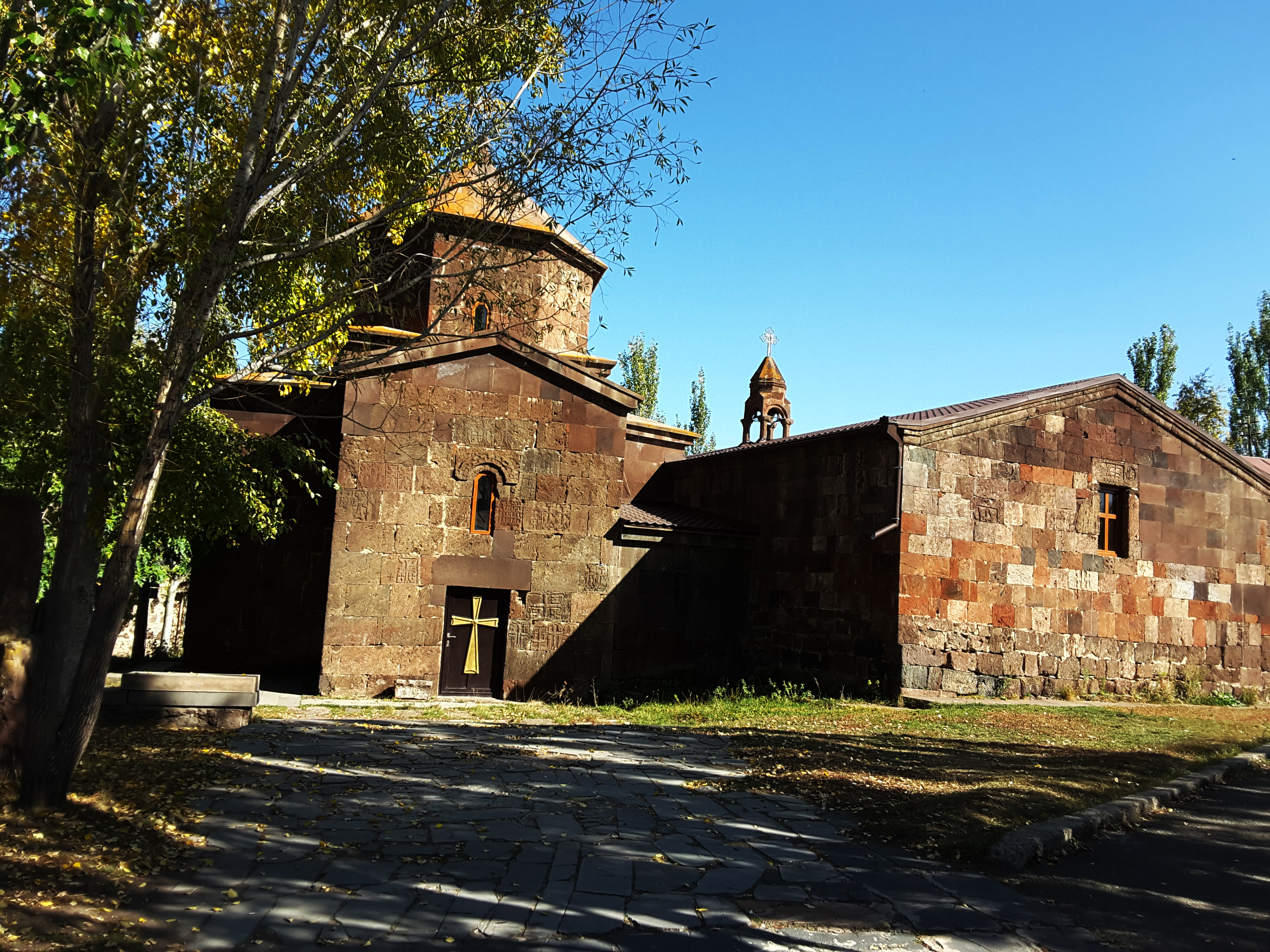

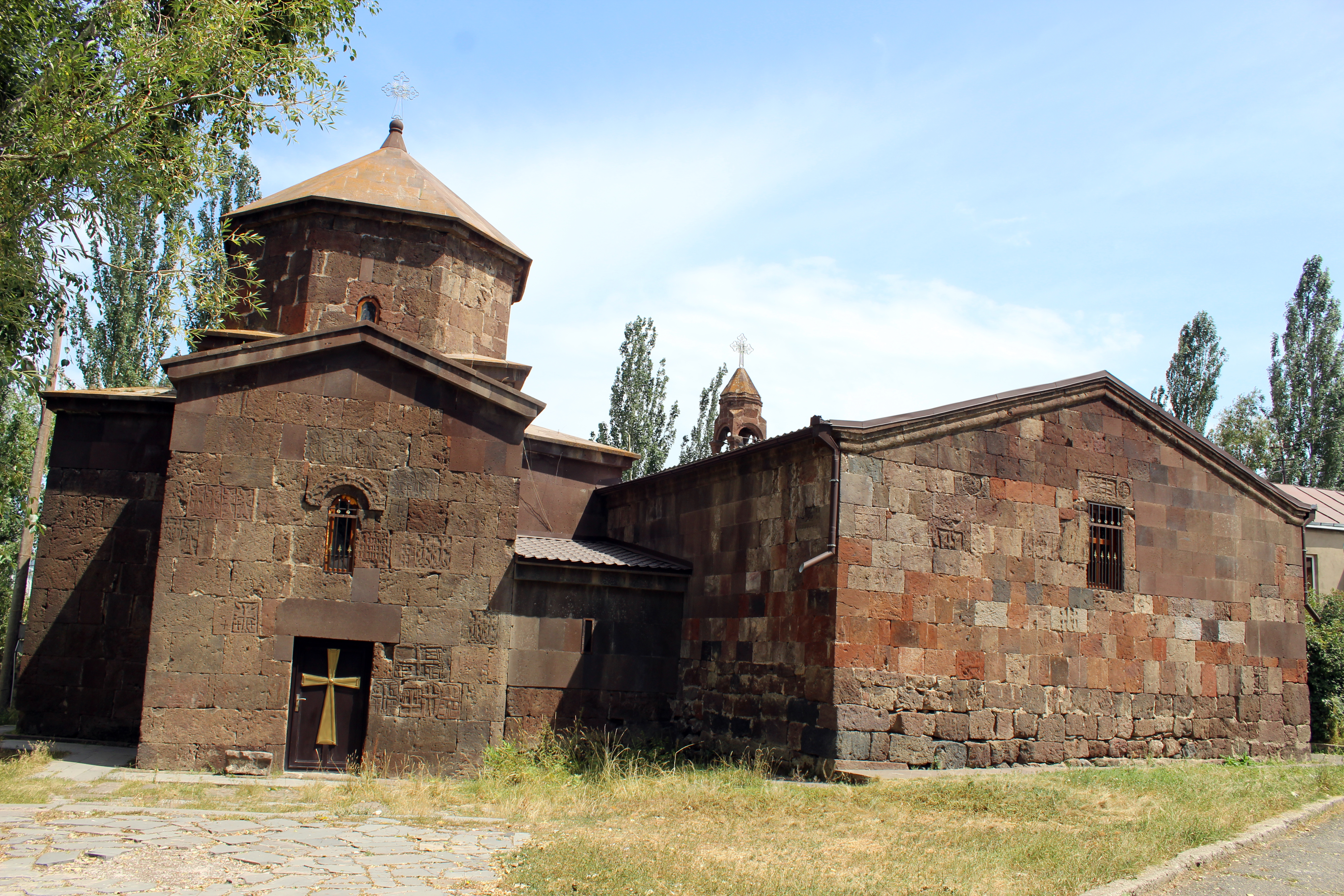

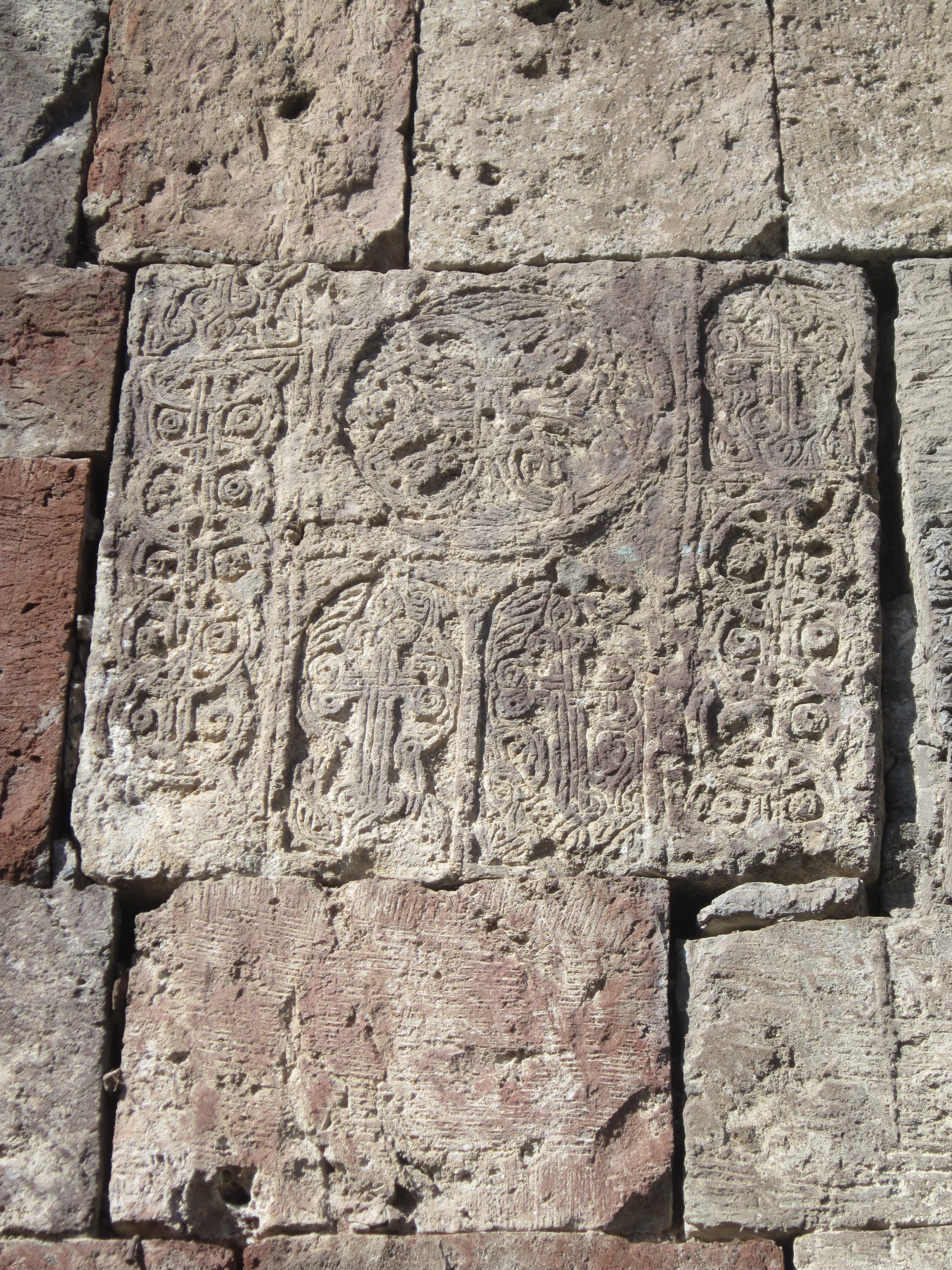

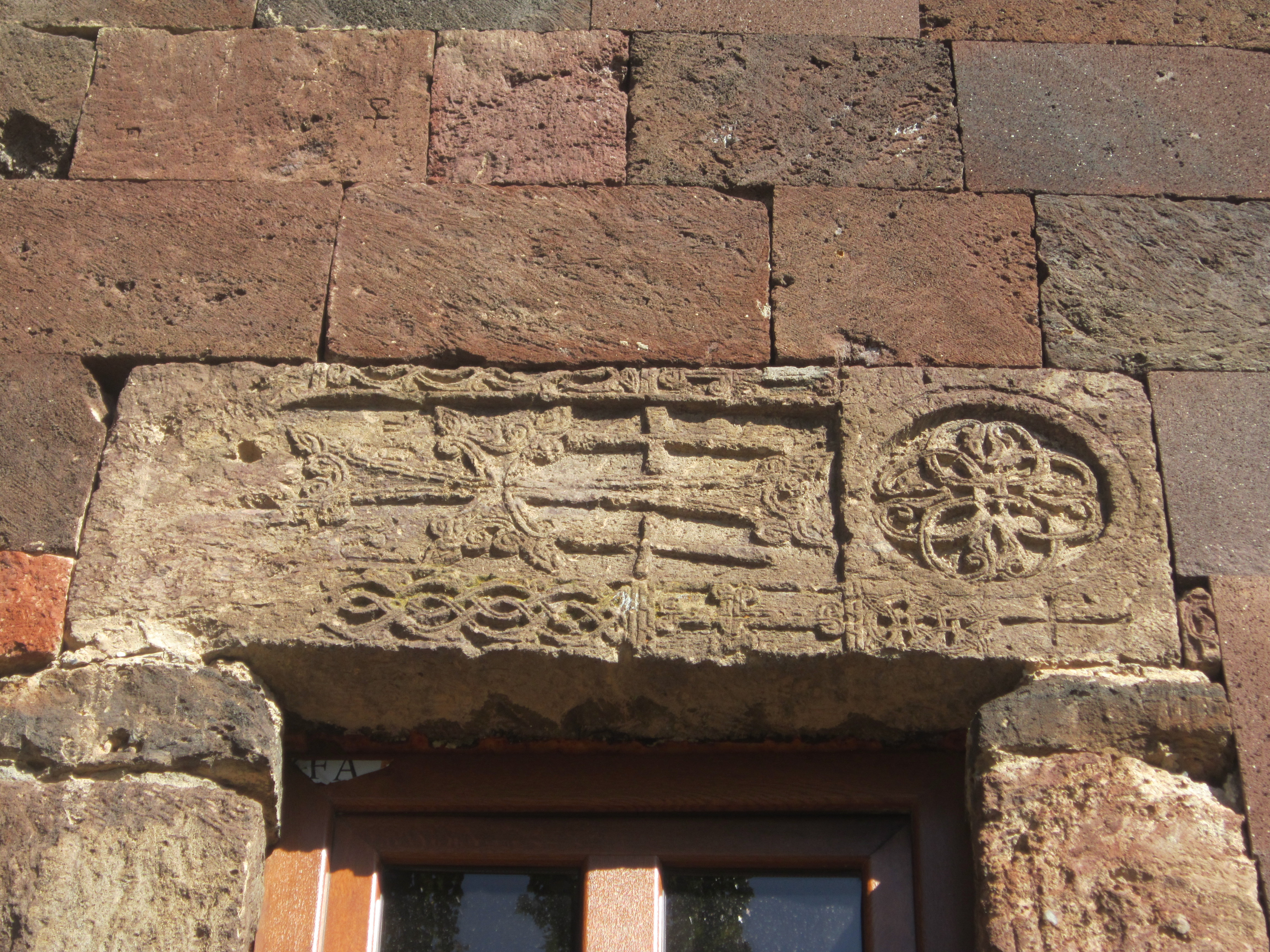

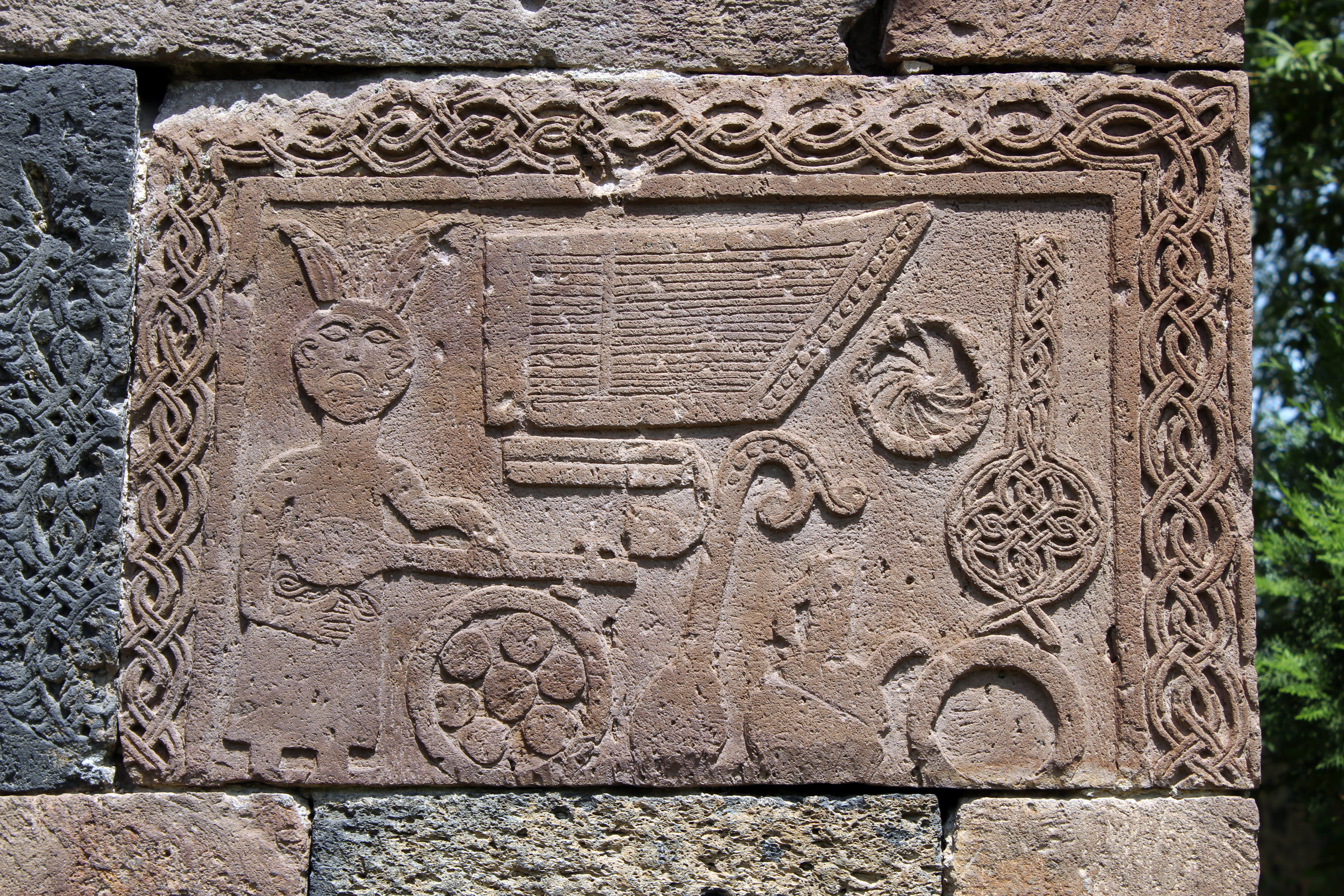

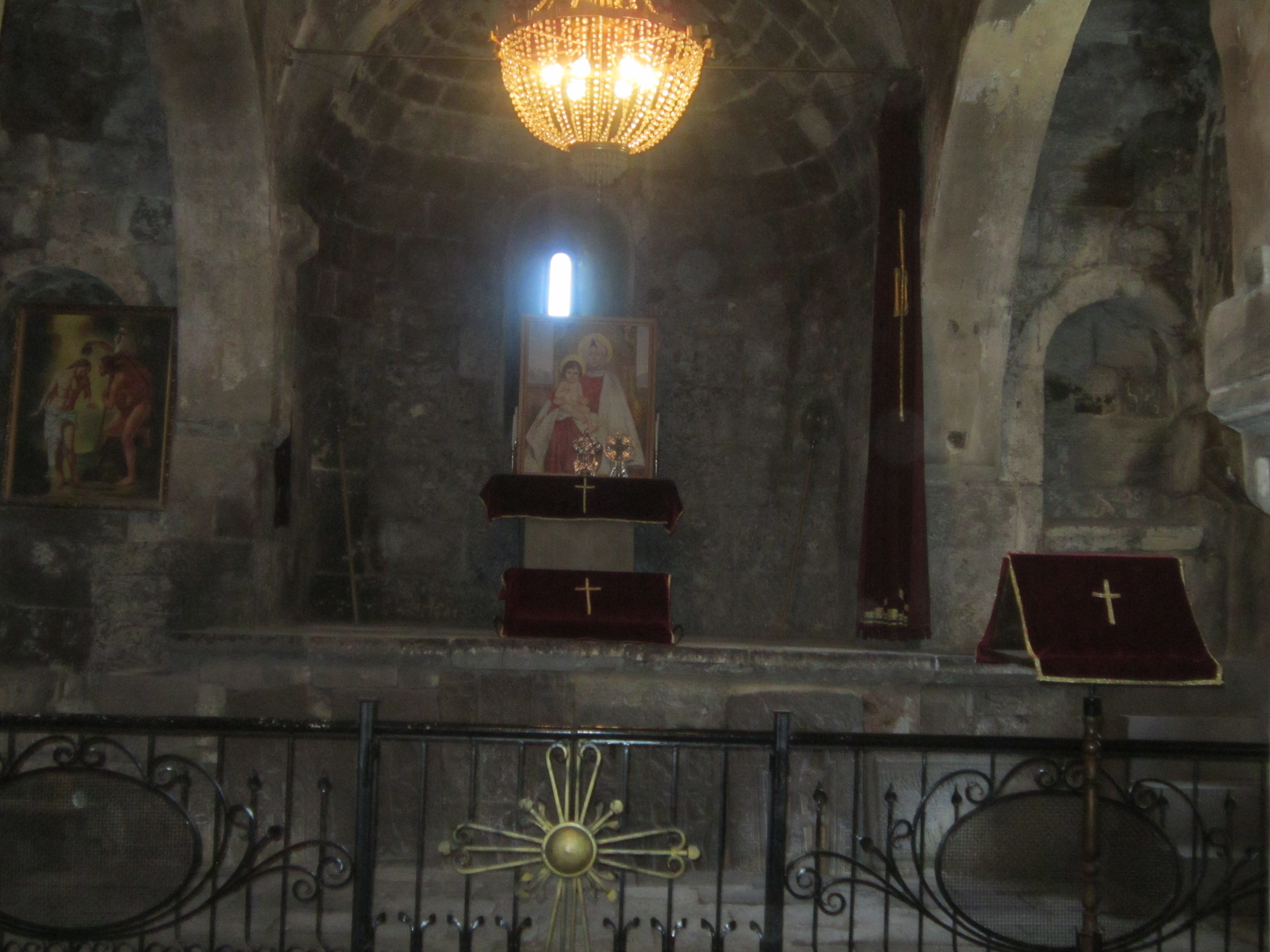

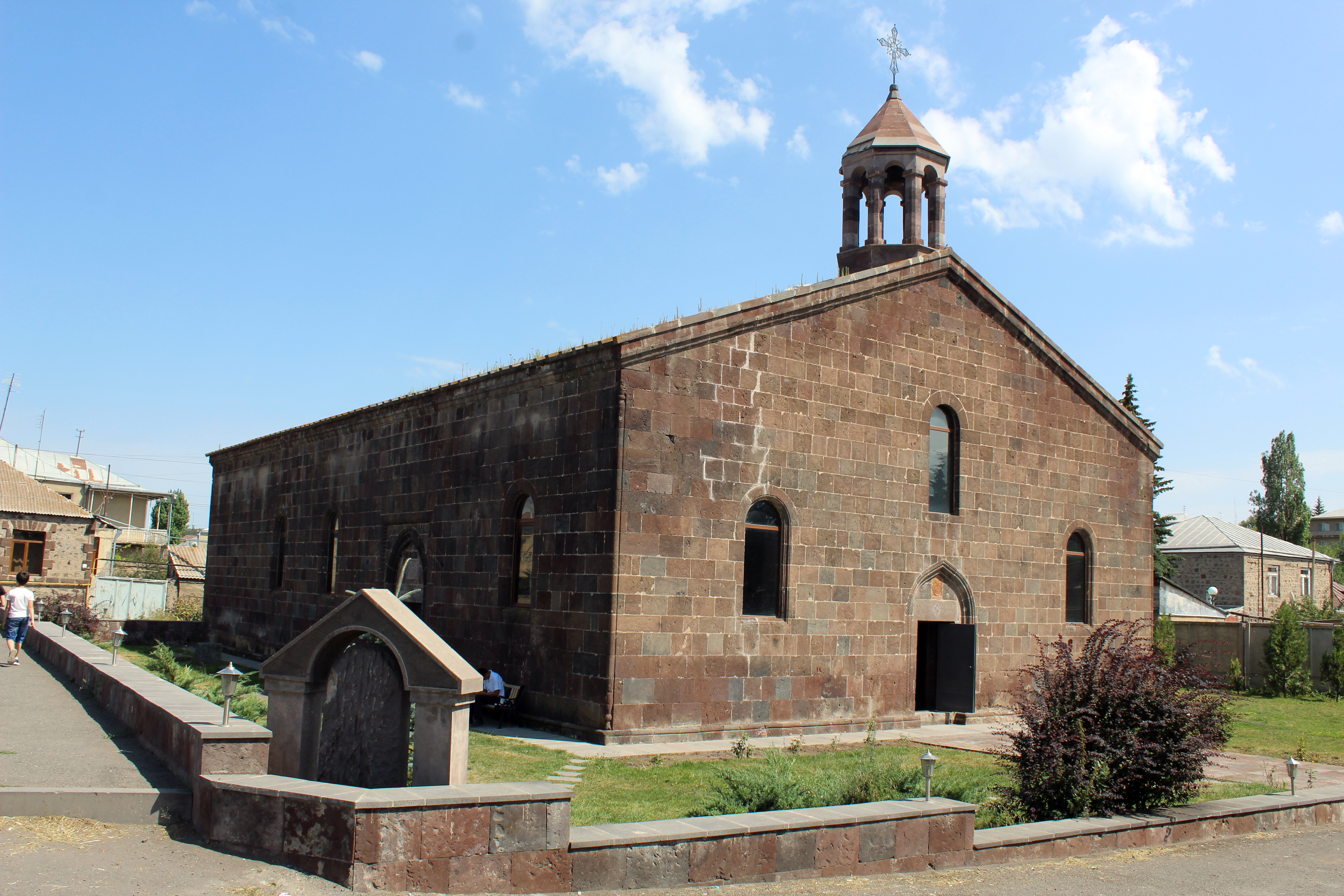

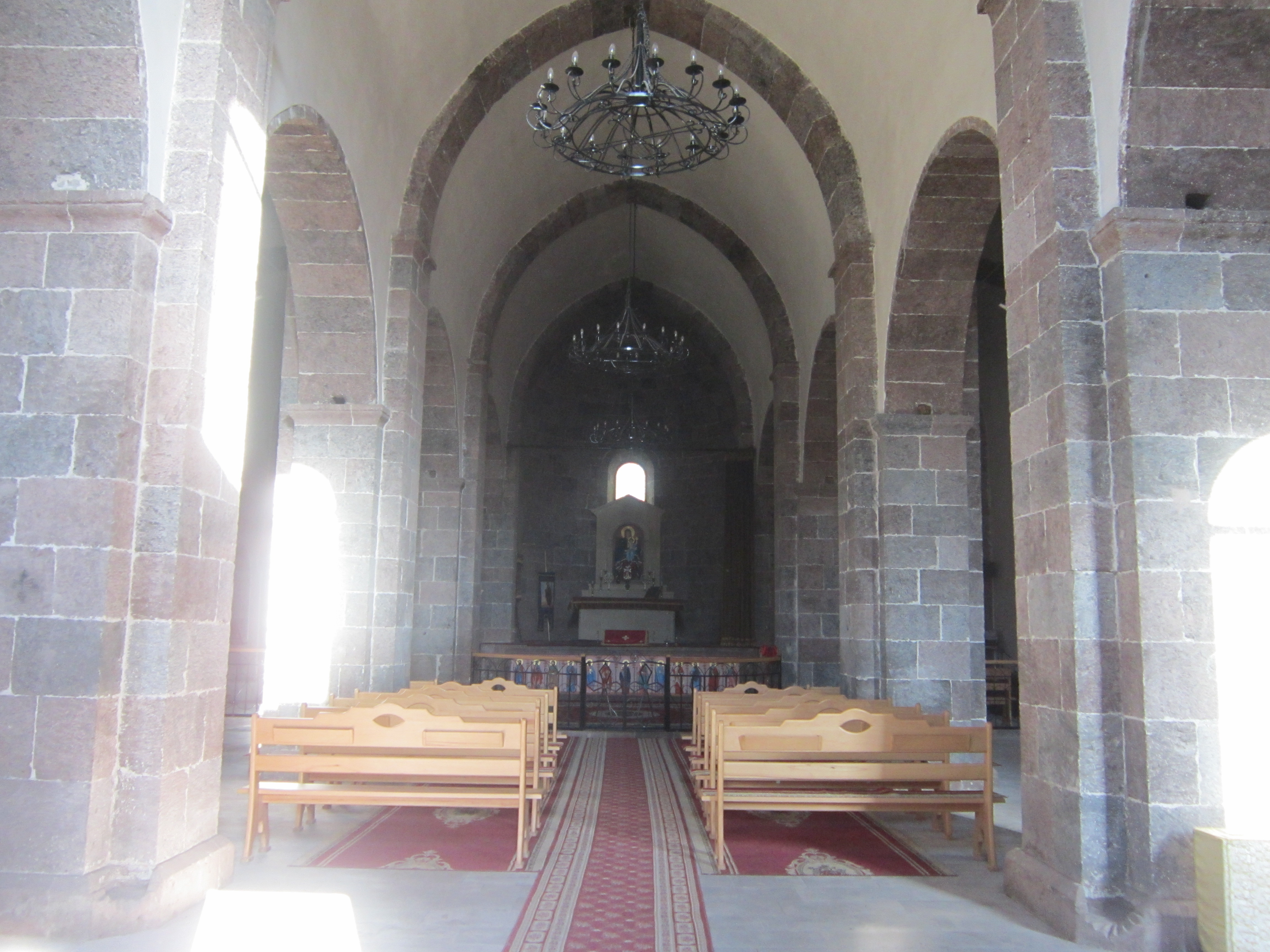

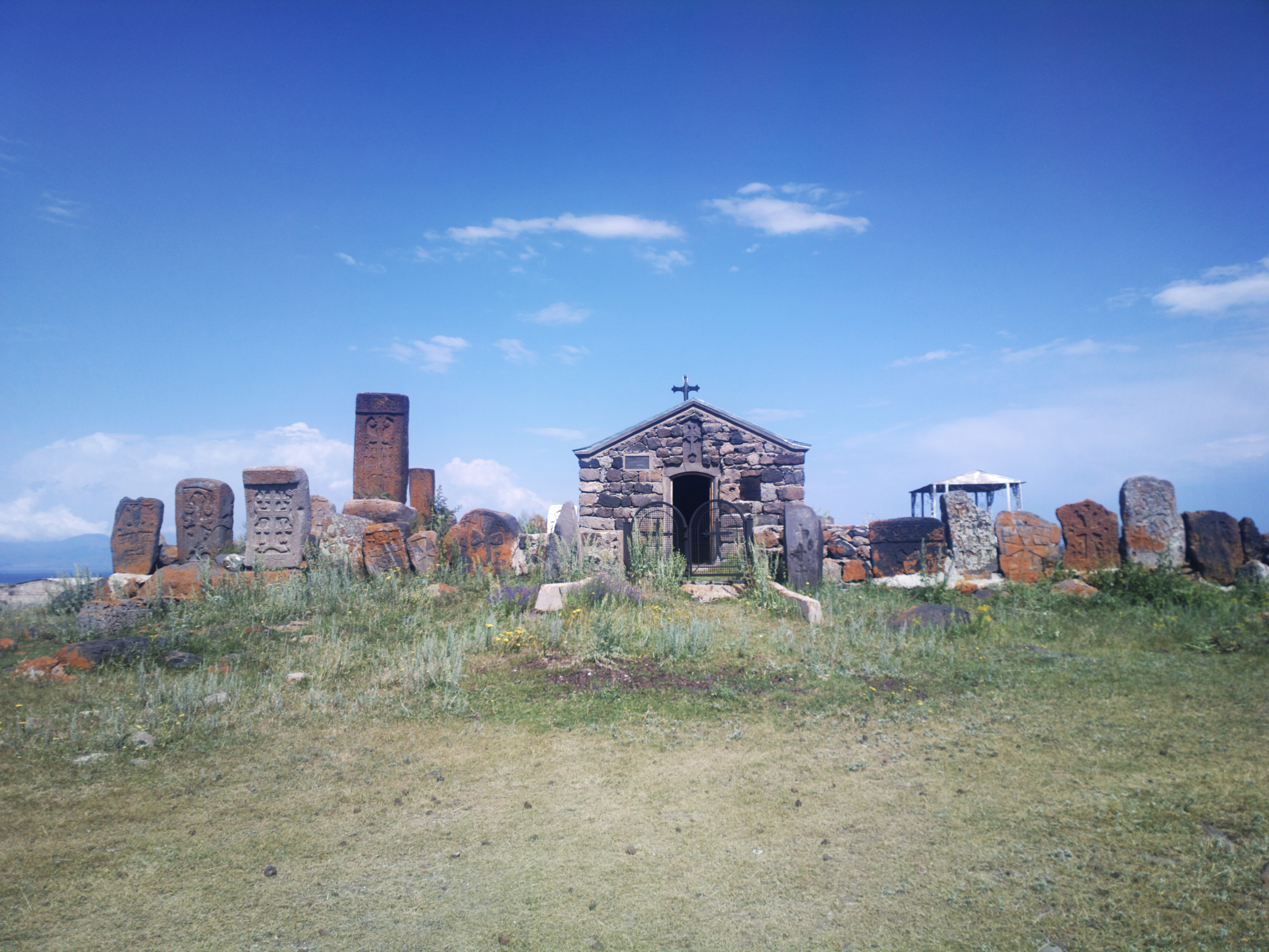

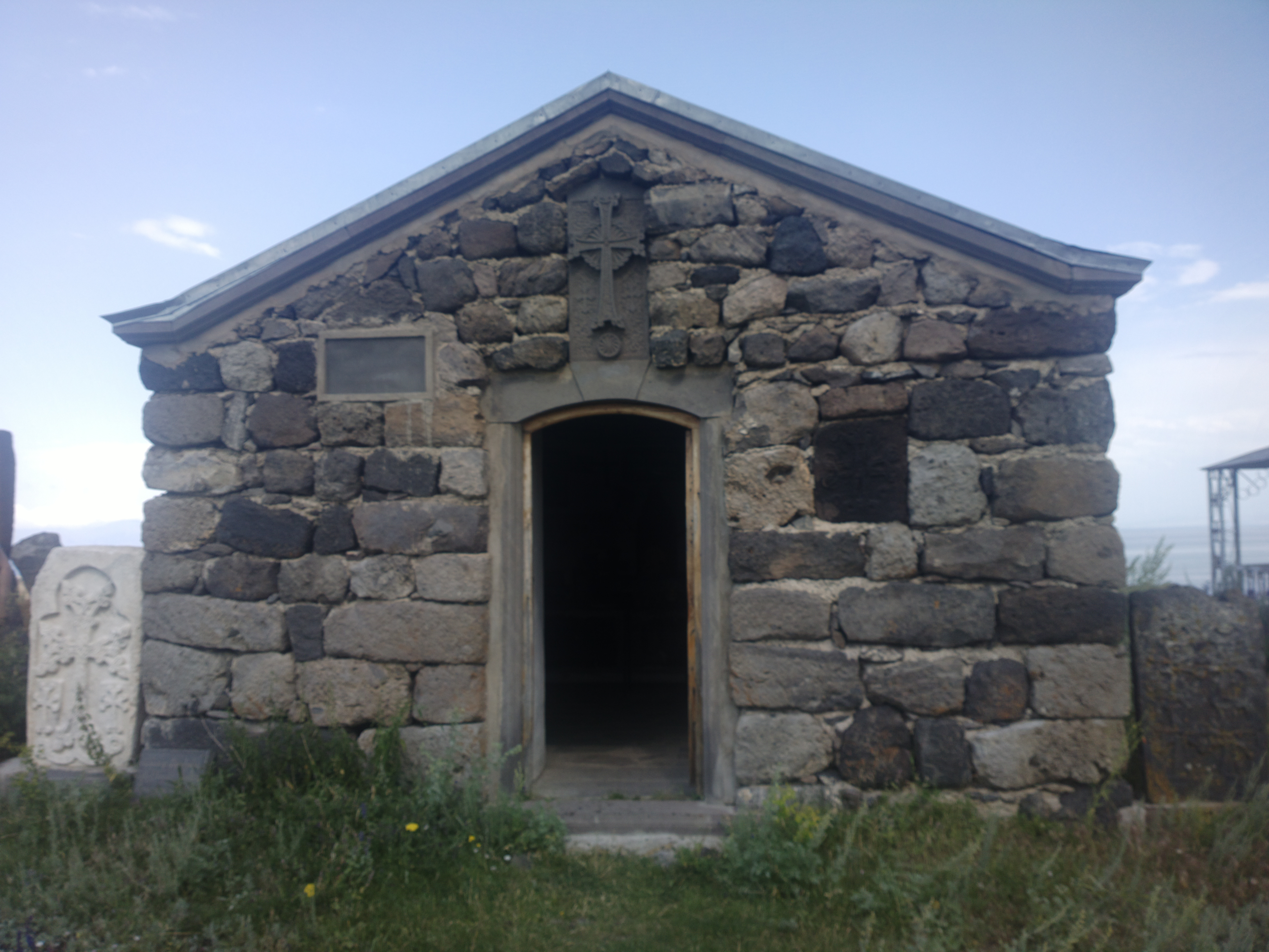

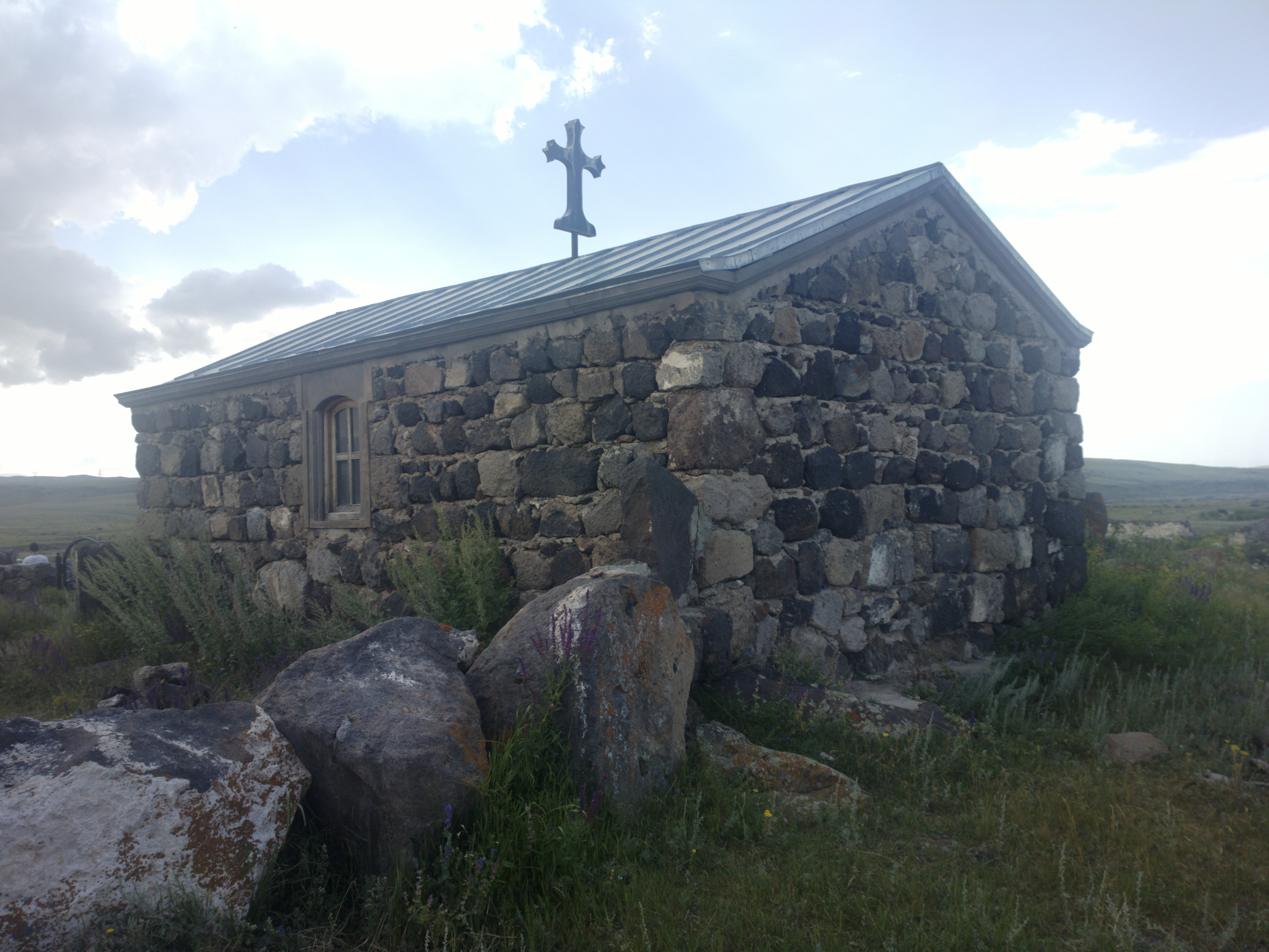

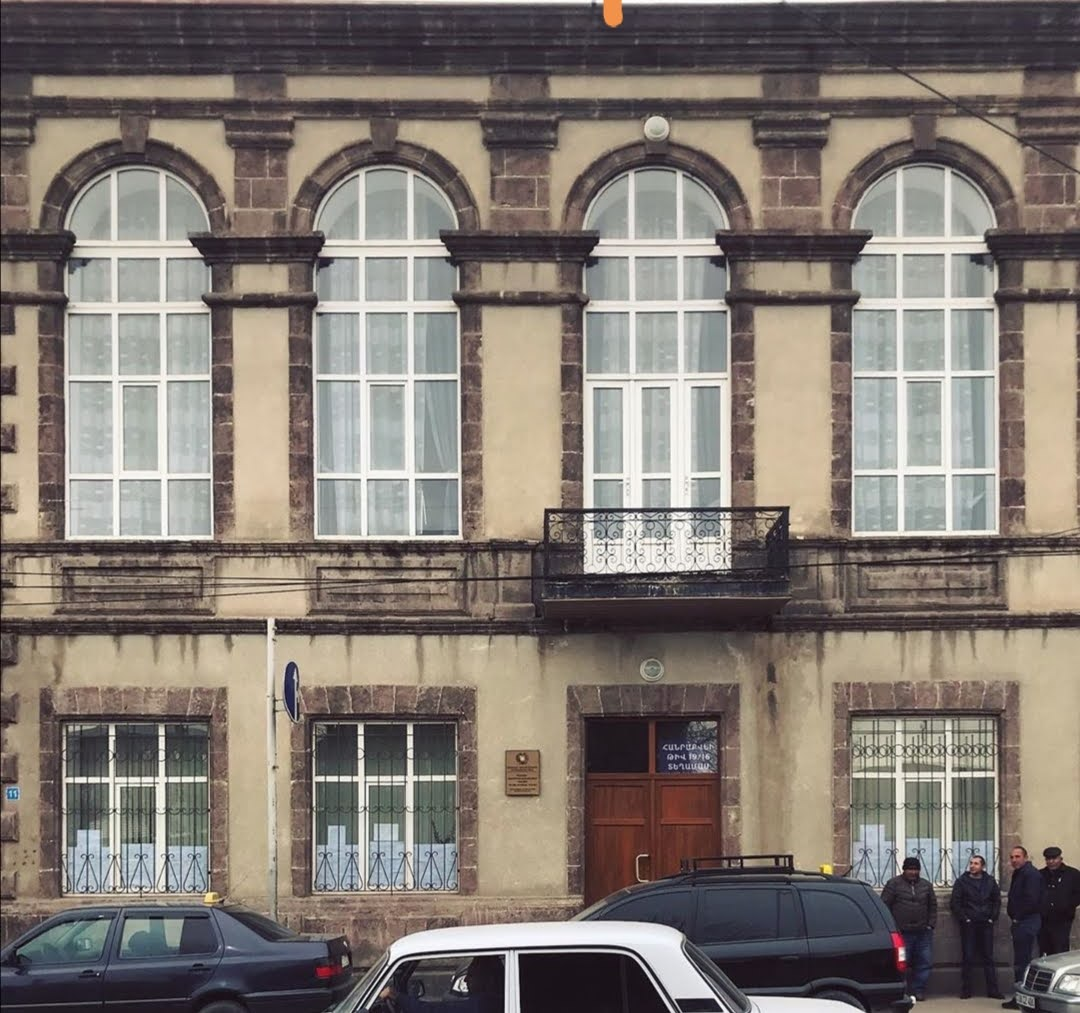

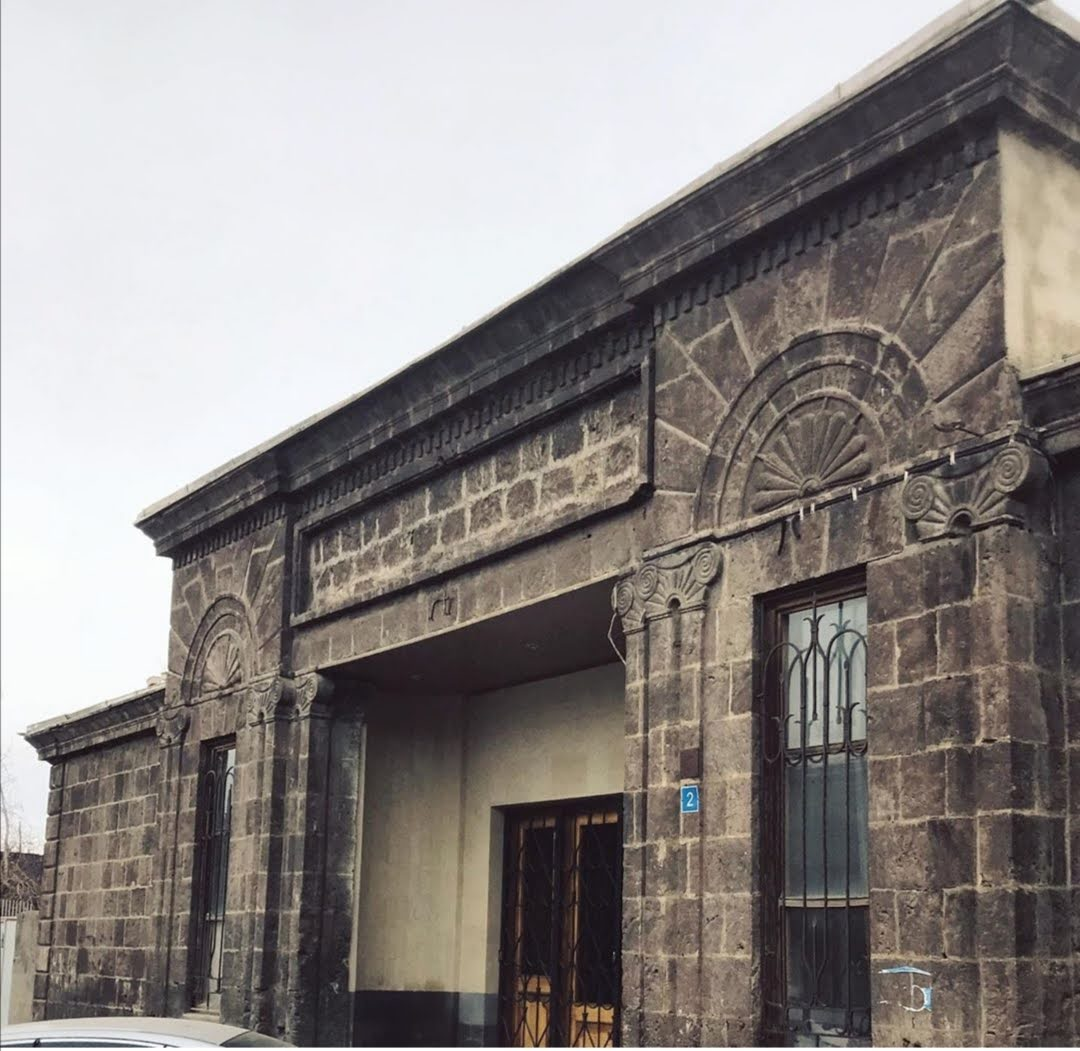

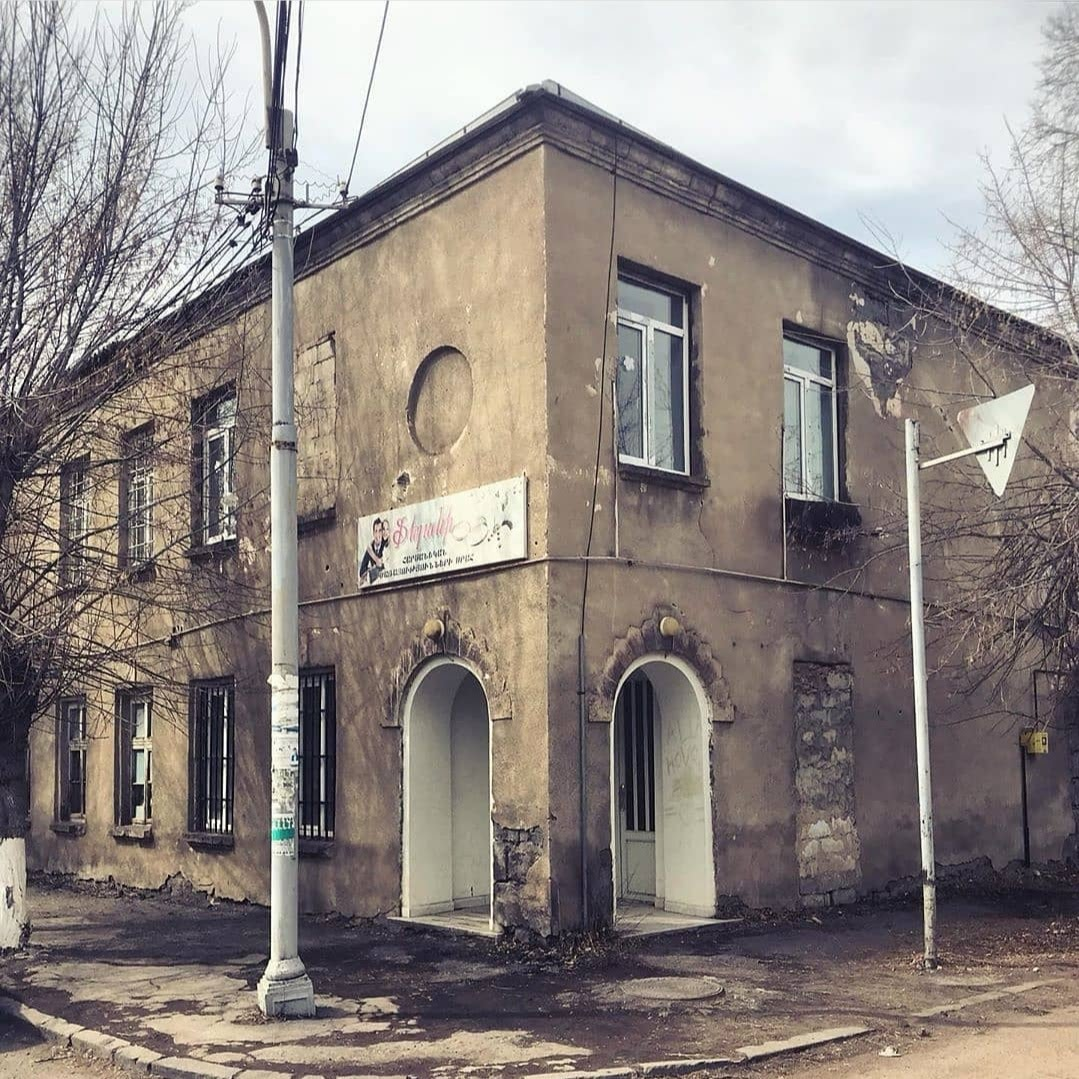

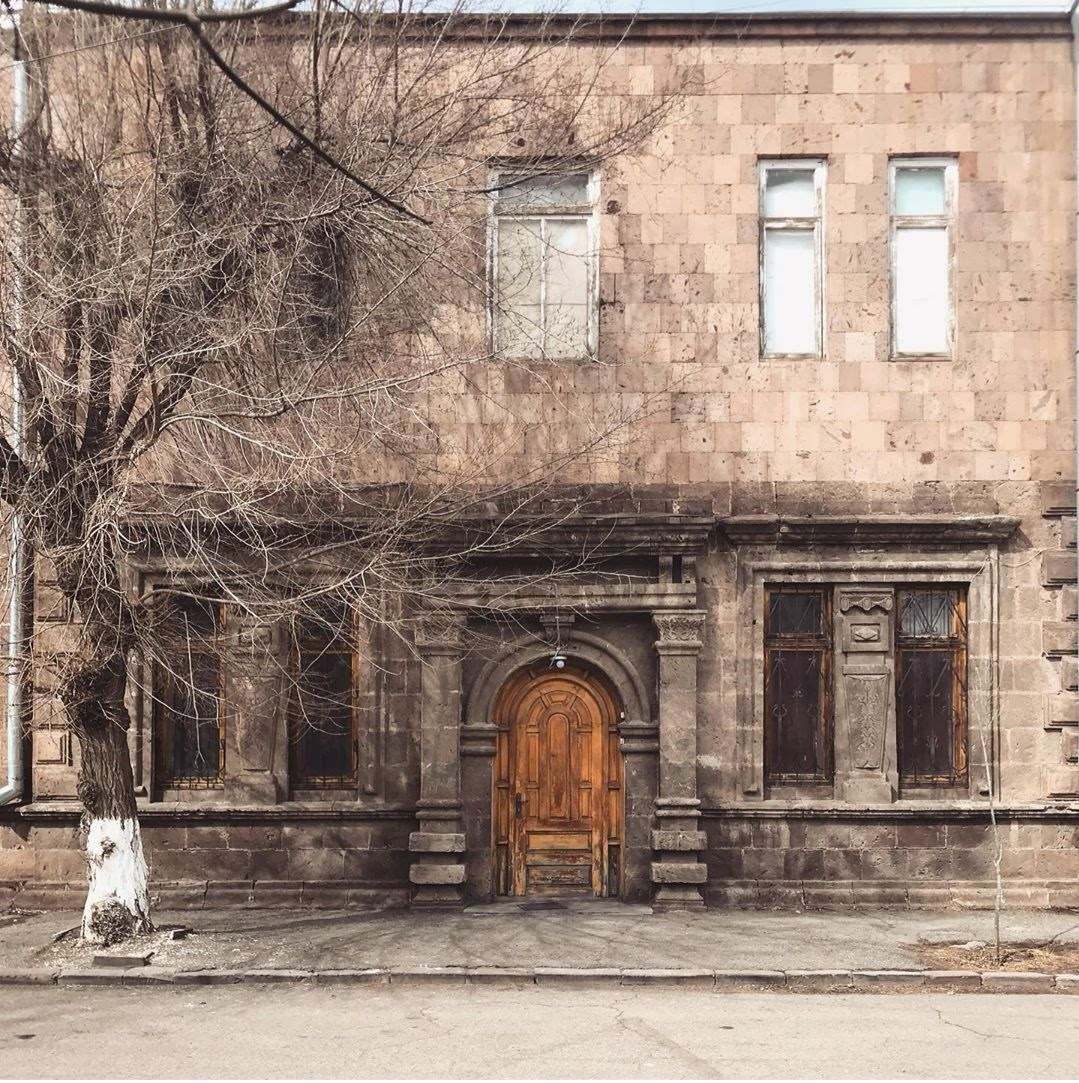

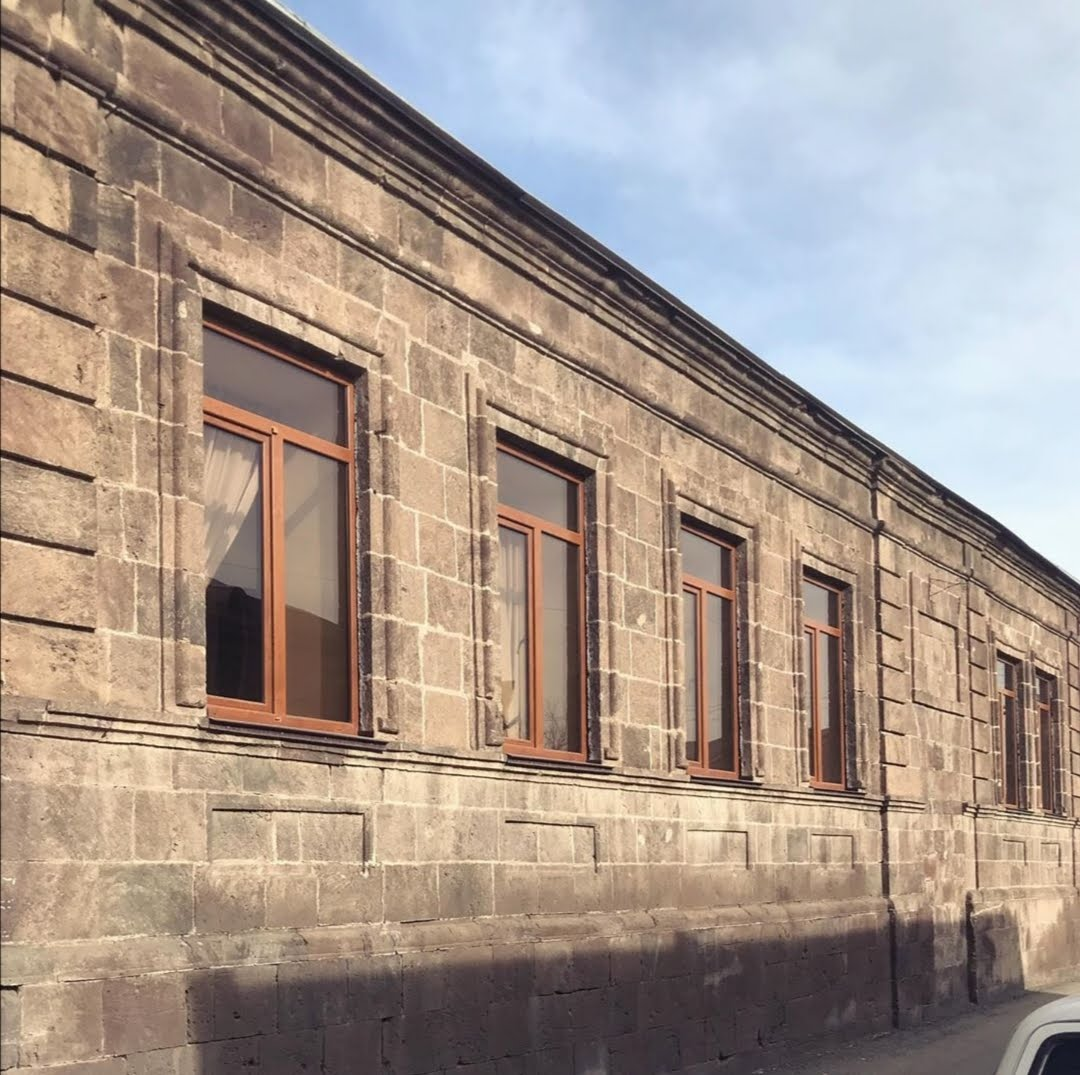

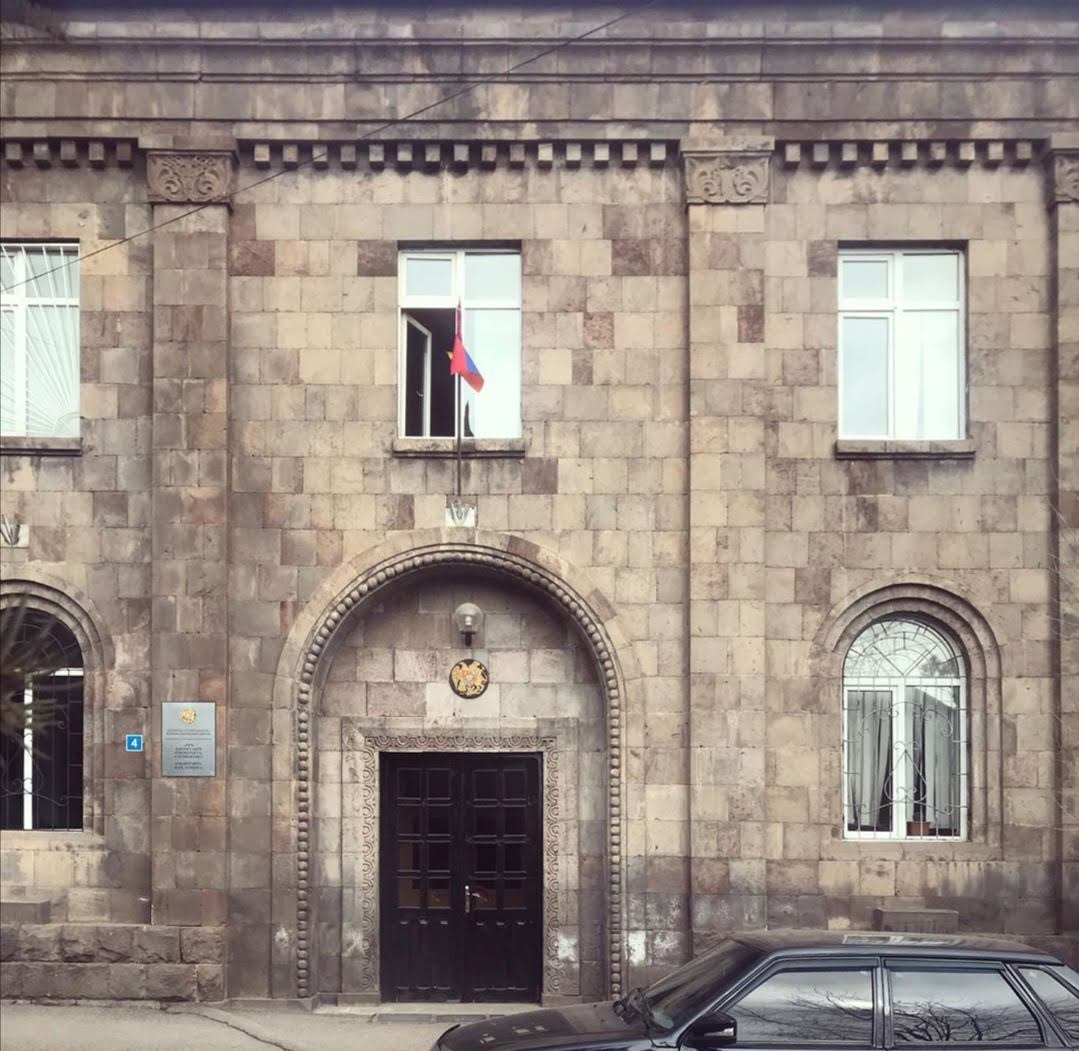

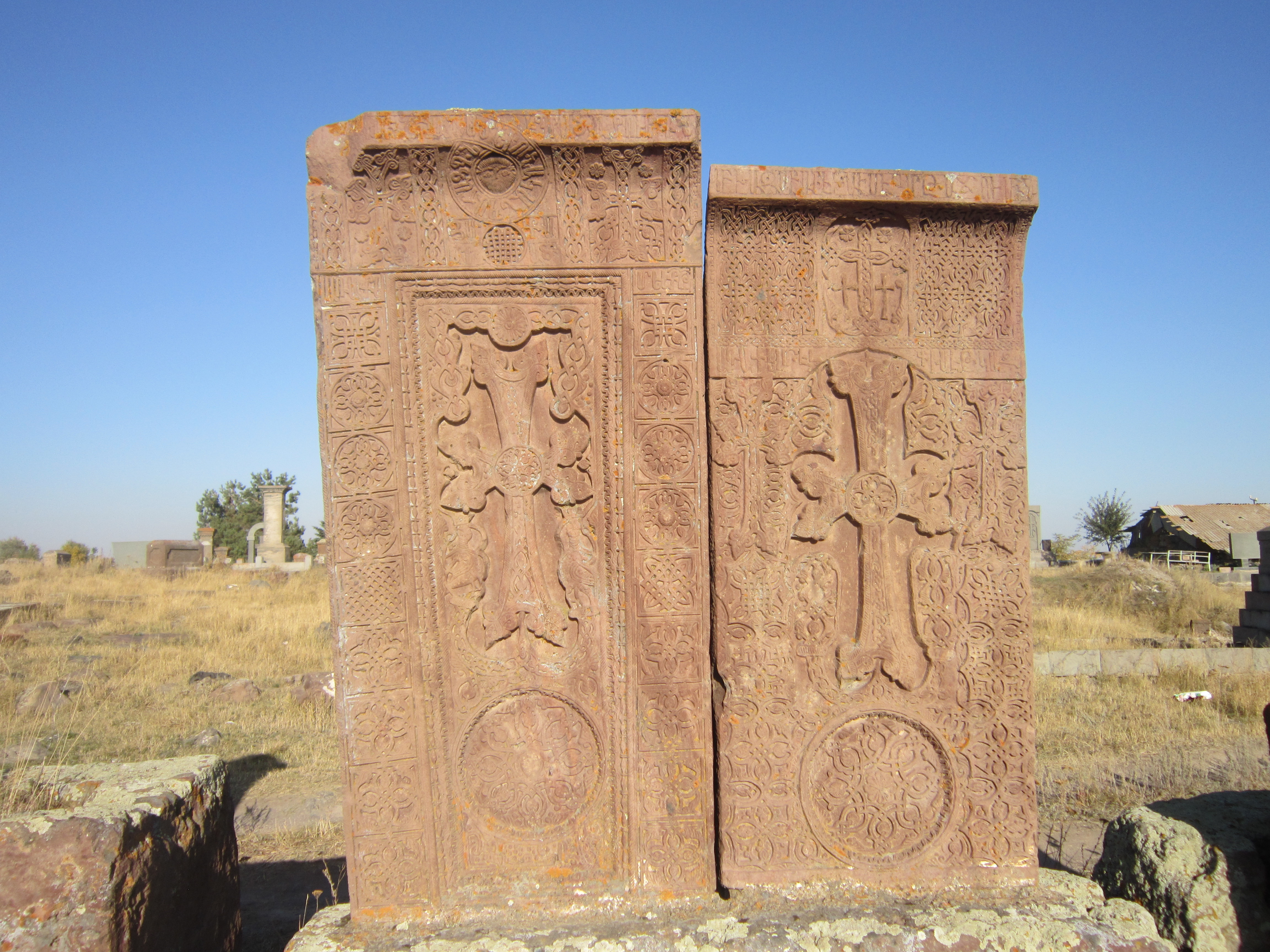

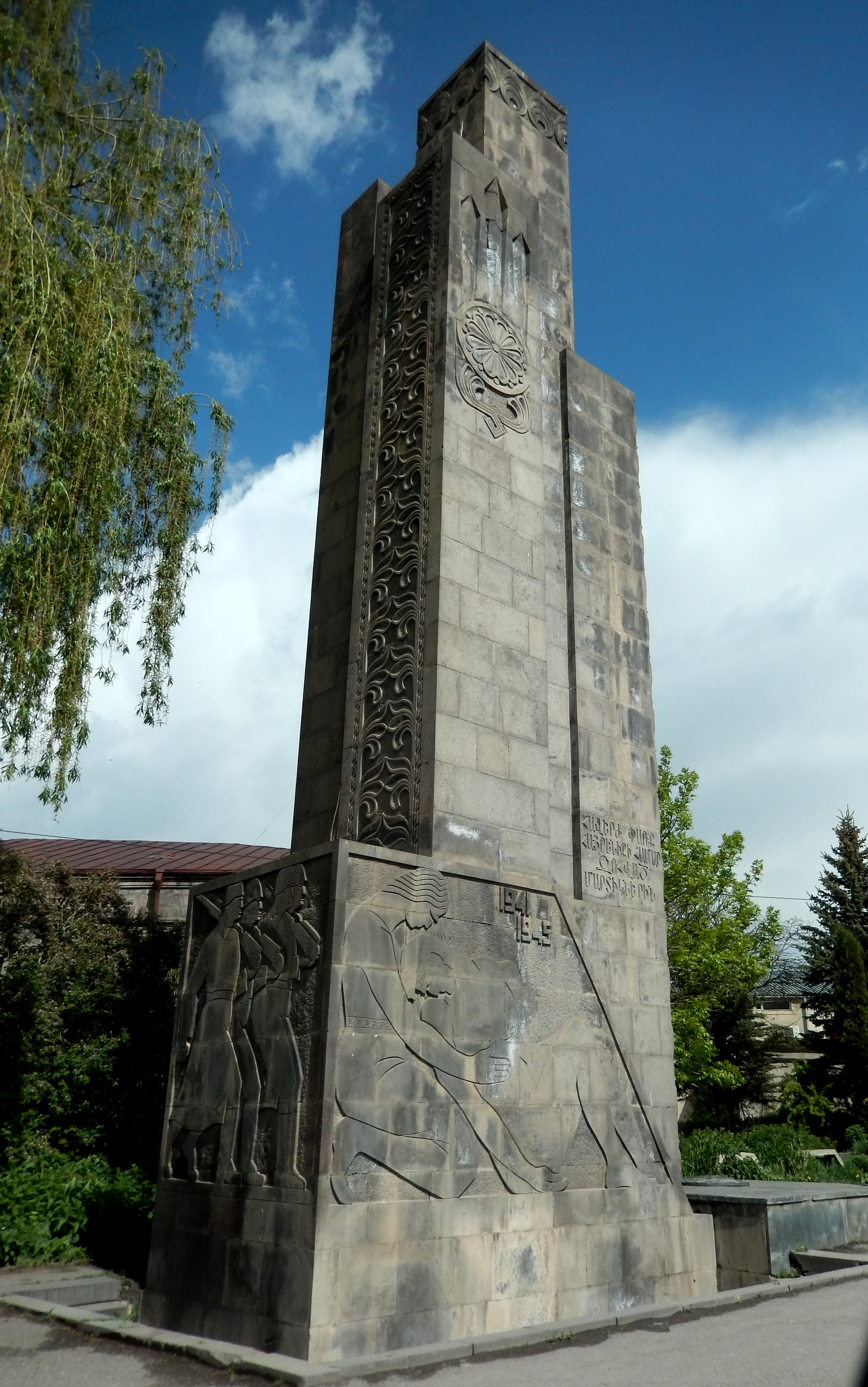

== See also ==
- Doğubayazıt
- Gavar State University
