= Armenian illuminated manuscripts =

Armenian decorated documents

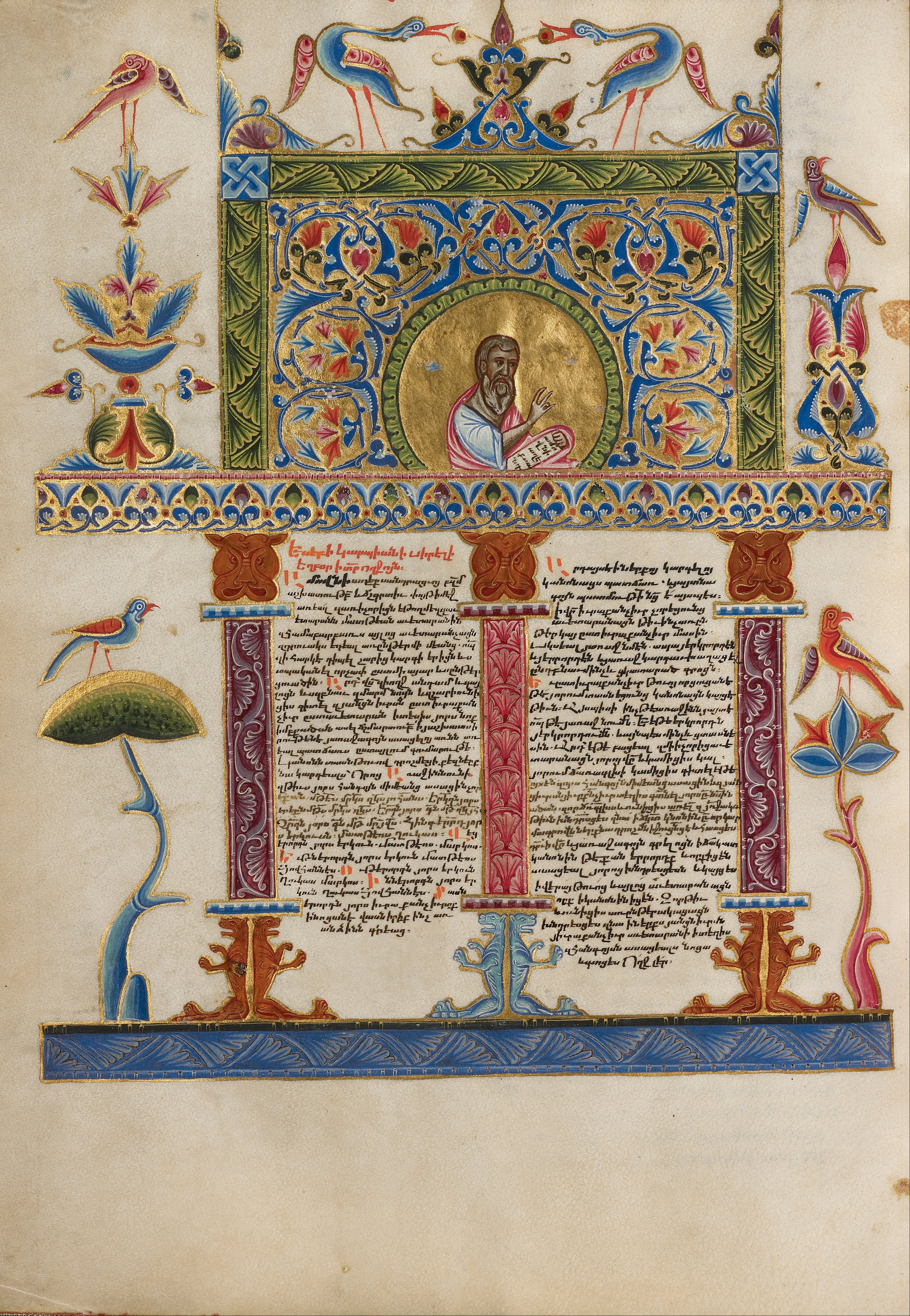
Example of an Armenian illuminated manuscript. An explanation of the Canon Tables with a portrait of its author, Eusebius. Made in Isfahan, Persia.

Armenian illuminated manuscripts (Armenian: Հայկական մանրանկարչություն, romanized: Haykakan manrankarch'owt'yown), form an Armenian tradition of formally prepared documents where the text is often supplemented with flourishes such as borders and miniature illustrations. They are related to other forms of Medieval Armenian art, Persian miniatures, and to Byzantine illuminated manuscripts. The earliest surviving examples date after the Golden Age of Armenian art and literature in the 6th century. Armenian illuminated manuscripts embody Armenian culture; they illustrate its spiritual and cultural values.

The most famous Armenian miniaturist, Toros Roslin, lived in the 13th century. The art form flourished in Greater Armenia, Lesser Armenia and the Armenian Diaspora. Its appearance dates back to the creation of the Armenian alphabet in Armenia, in the year 405 AD. Very few fragments of illuminated manuscripts from the 6th and 7th centuries have survived. The oldest fully preserved manuscript dates from the 9th century. Art experienced a golden age in the 13th and 14th centuries when the main schools and centers started to pop up (1,500 centers of writing and illumination). The most striking are those of Syunik, Vaspurakan and Cilicia. Many Armenian illuminated manuscripts outside the country of Armenia have also survived the centuries. Despite the creation of the Armenian printing press in the 16th century, the production of miniatures continued until the 19th century and survives through modern Armenian painting and cinema.

Armenian miniaturists have always been in contact with other artists of the East and the West whose art has deeply and richly influenced Armenian illumination. According to the Russian poet Valery Bryusov, "crossing and intertwining before merging into a single and entirely new whole, two forces, two opposing principles have, over the centuries, governed the destiny of Armenia and shaped the character of its people: the principle of the West and that of the East, the spirit of Europe and the spirit of Asia". The most famous works of Armenian miniaturists are distinguished by precise skill in execution, originality of composition and color treatment, brilliance due to the use of pigments mainly prepared with the bases of metal oxides and an extremely stylized portrayal of the world.

The Matenadaran Institute in Yerevan has the largest collection of Armenian manuscripts, including the Mugni Gospels and Echmiadzin Gospels. The second-largest collection of Armenian illuminated manuscripts is stored in the depository of the St. James Cathedral, of the Holy Apostolic Church's Patriarchate of Jerusalem. Other collections exist in the British Library, Bibliothèque nationale de France, and other large collections at the Mechitarist establishments in Venice and Vienna, as well as in the United States. The University of California, Los Angeles (UCLA) holds the Gladzor Gospels (cf. University of Gladzor), a richly illuminated Armenian Gospel manuscript dating to the 14th century, among its collection of Armenian manuscripts, the largest in the United States.

== Origins ==
=== Emergence ===
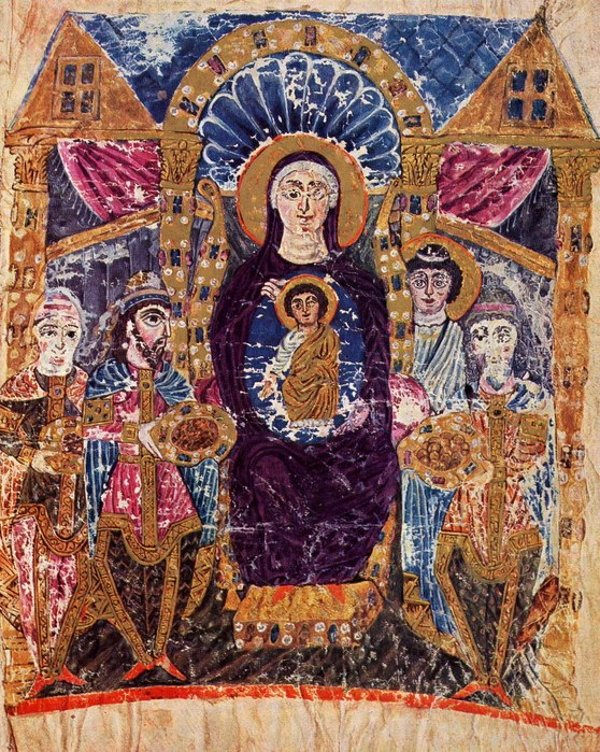
One of the four oldest pages of Armenian miniatures. Echmiadzin gospels, 500s-600s AD. Miniatures of the Bible (in biblically chronological order); annunciation of Zechariah, annunciation of Mary, adoration of the magi and the baptism of Jesus by John the Baptist.

The Armenian form of miniatures and illuminations probably originated with the creation of the first Armenian books at the beginning of the 5th century, but a hiatus of four centuries separated the emergence of the art from the oldest preserved illuminated manuscripts (with the exception of the 'Final Four Miniatures' of the Echmiadzin Gospels); the latter, however, is probably inspired by earlier manuscripts. At its beginnings, the art of the illuminator was done by the same scribe who wrote the manuscript, the ornamentations like the text, only simple copies of earlier models, but in the 9th and 10th centuries, it became more refined and sophisticated until it separated from the work of the scribe to form a unique role in the making of manuscripts. The first surviving manuscripts are the tetra-gospels (including, in addition to the four gospels, the Letter of Eusebius and the Eusebian canons and the "mystical allegory of the economy of salvation") which already demonstrate the diversity in genre, style and technique of the illustrations. The art got influenced by Byzantine art, with its monumental appearance (see for example the Gospel of Trebizond, 11th century, San Lazzaro degli Armeni, Ms. 1400), and by oriental art, with its taste for heavily ornamented pages (illustrated in the Mughni gospel, 11th century, Matenadaran, Ms. 7736), the two influences were sometimes found in one manuscript (such as the Gospel of King Gagik of Kars, 11th century, Armenian Patriarchate of Jerusalem, Ms. 2556).

The time period stretching from the 10th to the 11th centuries encompassed the formation of Armenian artistic traditions, which witnessed the development of its diversity, a balance between early Christian elements and new influences, as shown by "the special role of missals, the important contributions made by the patrons and the goal to express in images the power of the Gospel", and a reinterpretation of Byzantine decorative elements in the light of Islamic art, as well as the taste for bright and brilliant colors. The miniatures usually occupy full pages, most often at the beginning of the manuscript, but sometimes also appear in the body of the text, in the form of marginal illustrations, and are expressed with great liberty in the Eusebian canons.

The oldest of the well-preserved ornamented manuscripts is the Gospel of Queen Mlke, named after the wife of King Gagik I of Vaspurakan, who had it restored in the 10th century(San Lazzaro degli Armeni, Ms. 1144). Made in Vaspurakan around 862 AD, it is the first illuminated manuscript known after the Arab occupation period (7th - 9th centuries) and the oldest of the fully preserved Armenian manuscripts. Inspired by an older manuscript, its illustrations, in particular, the Nilotic landscape of the tables and the frontispiece resemble the Syriac Rabbula Gospels while presenting an early Christian echo, something common in the East at the time, but show a solemnity only found in Armenian examples of illuminated manuscripts. With a somewhat stern style, the thin and light lines and the subtle gradations of colors are reminiscent of the art from the Macedonian renaissance, while standing out from it by using a lively and saturated palette. These characteristics make this Gospel “a unique example of reception and interpretation of the ancient heritage in the Armenian milieu”.

The Echmiadzin Gospel Book (Matenadaran, Ms. 2374) is another famous example of these early manuscripts. Produced in 989 at the monastery of Bgheno-Noravank, the sumptuous work has a Byzantine ivory binding (second half of the 6th century) and incorporates four full-page miniatures, grouped on two leaves, from the 6th to 7th centuries, in a style similar to 7th-century frescoes while reflecting a Sassanian influence that is especially noticeable with the clothing and hairstyles of the Magi^{,} these four miniatures with a monumental character in the treatment of the characters, characterized by their large eyes and freely brushed modeled faces, whose architectural decoration recalls Christian house of worship from the late antiquity, are part of the early Christian pictorial tradition and thus constitute a persistence of the ancient tradition. Other miniatures from the 11th and 12th centuries are found in this manuscript, notably introductory miniatures illustrating the major themes of salvation and the four Evangelists, and are of a less antique style than those of the late 6th century pages from the same manuscript and those of the queen Mlke Gospel. While demonstrating freshness and eloquence and adopting neutral backgrounds. "An exceptional example of the blossoming of painting can be seen in the aftermath of Arab domination", Jannic Durand, a French art historian, also describes the Gospel of Queen Mlké as "the highest expression of a classical antiquizing current which crossed in the 9th and 10th centuries paintings in Armenia, perfectly distinct from the more abstract and decorative current which also characterized it at the same time, represented in particular by the Gospel of Baltimore”.

Other manuscripts include: the Gospel of Baltimore (The Gospels of the Translators or The Four Gospels) (Walters Art Museum, Ms. 537) produced in 966, which is an example of a radical transformation of the architectural decorations with its use of small geometric patterns, or the 'Gospel of Vahapar' (Matenadaran, Ms. 10780), produced before 1088 in Vaspurakan or Melitene, it includes sixty-six Christological illustrations in the text, in a naïve but lively style, and accompanied by speech scrolls reminiscent to modern comic strips, it is the probable source of inspiration in the 14th century for the Gospel of Gladzor.

The Seljuk invasions of the second half of the eleventh century marked another halt, and it also started the beginning of a period of decline for the art of miniatures in Greater Armenia until the thirteenth century (with rare exceptions, such as the Gospel of Matenadaran, Ms. 2877, decorated with great attention to small details), while a renewal was taking place in Cilicia.

== Development ==
=== Apotheosis ===
Map of Greater Armenia, c. 1000 AD

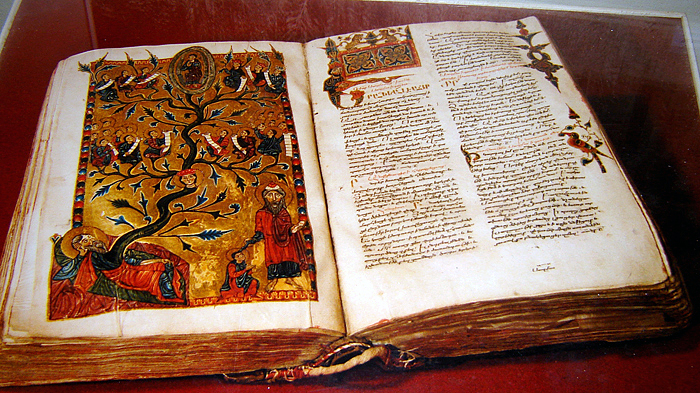
Example of an Armenian illuminated manuscript from the Gladzor University, 13-14th century.

The political and cultural life in Greater Armenia experienced a brief development at the end of the twelfth and the beginning of the thirteenth century, with the support of neighboring Georgia. The Armenians then managed to fight off the Seljuk invasions and experienced a certain boom called the “Zakarid renaissance”. As a result, they formed an independent principality governed by the Zakarids in which a brief period of relative peace reigned before the coming of the Mongol invasions of Transcaucasia between 1220 and 1240.

Construction projects of palaces and churches grew in number in the first half of the 13th century. In parallel, the activity of the schools of miniaturists and scriptoria was in full expansion; grammar, language, rhetoric, theology, philosophy, music, painting and calligraphy were all taught there, notably in the universities (hamalsaran) of Tatev and Gladzor, often called as the “second Athens”. This last university, "almost contemporary with one of the main centers of European thought, the University of Paris, could compete with the latter as much in terms of cultural training as by the richness of its library and the diversity of the subjects taught. ”. Only a few ruins of the University of Gladzor remain today, a result of the Mongol and Timurid invasions.

As if to compensate for the catastrophic losses by these invasions, the Armenian kingdom of Cilicia flourished from the eleventh century to the end of the fourteenth century. Art and culture developed there until its fall at the end of the 14th century under the conquering advance of the Egyptian Mamluks.

This period saw the peak of Armenian illuminated manuscripts: “For example, the miniatures painted in the northeastern regions are distinguished by their monumental character and the intensity of their colors; while the ones in the Vaspurakan school by their simplicity and a tendency to stylization. The illuminations of Bardzr Khaïk, or Upper Armenia, can be recognized by the majestic gravity of the characters and the variety of their ornamentation; while the Cilician miniatures display remarkable refinement and virtuosity”. The miniatures of Cilicia and Greater Armenian were variants of the same national art of which they share the fundamental features, they were however distinguished: “the Cilician miniatures acquired in a short time a brilliant level and a great depth of expression. While keeping their own unique style, they reflect their miniaturists' interest in the early western European Renaissance. The miniatures of Greater Armenia, from which many schools and currents arose in the 13th and 14th centuries, are simpler, more monumental and more original. They were able to retain an expressiveness that was unparalleled in any painting of the time”.

=== Miniatures of Greater Armenia ===
==== Upper Armenia ====
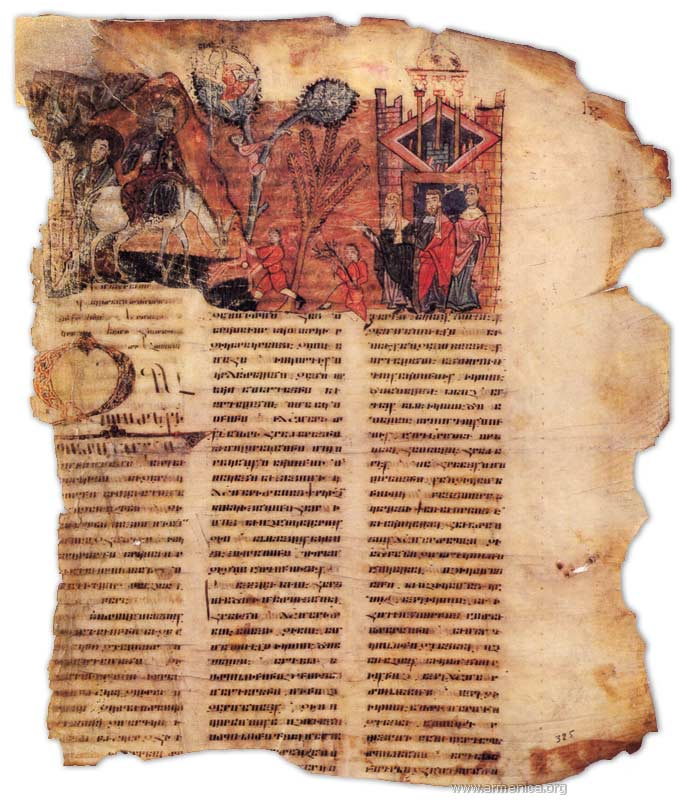
Page from the Homiliary of Mush, Matenadaran, 1200-1202

The surviving manuscripts of upper Armenian origins, a northwestern region of historic Armenia, crossing several roads of transit axis in the 13th century, are "always decorated with rich vegetal motifs, curved leaves with the sharpness of a sickle and scrolls with palmettes”. At first, treated "in a fairly realistic manner", these motifs gradually experienced an "increasingly pronounced stylization", to end up spreading to the art of Transcaucasia, the Near East and the Middle East.

In the largest of the known Armenian manuscripts, the Homiliary of Mush (monastery of the Holy Apostles, 1200-1202, Matenadaran, Ms. 7729), written in erkataghir (Armenian uncials), the pages are filled with vignettes and marginal motifs of Armenian pagan origin. This is largely due to the pagan and Zoroastrian sanctuaries getting consecrated as temples dedicated to Christianity, a result of the Christianization of the country in 301 AD with the conversion of the king of Armenia, Tiridates III from paganism to Christianity. Subsequently, elements inherited from ancient paganism mixed with Christian art, but they carried new meanings. This homily symbolizes with its ornamentation a search for the renovation of already existing shapes and an effort to create new motifs. It seems to be the work of three artists of whom only the name of the author of the title page has been preserved: Stepanos. A second miniaturist executed an important series of more vivid miniatures. With a more fiery temperament, he painted in the margins of the manuscript vegetal ornaments of various shapes, in which birds as well as real and fantastic animals are also found. From a stylistic point of view, warm color combinations are based on the principle of contrasts. The orange tones are shaded with dark brown, they contrast with the light blue of the intense velvety ultramarine. As for the third miniaturist, he is the author of only a small number of subject miniatures. The harmonious balance of the text and the ornamented parts, as well as the text-image relationship, characterizes well the composition of the pages of this period.

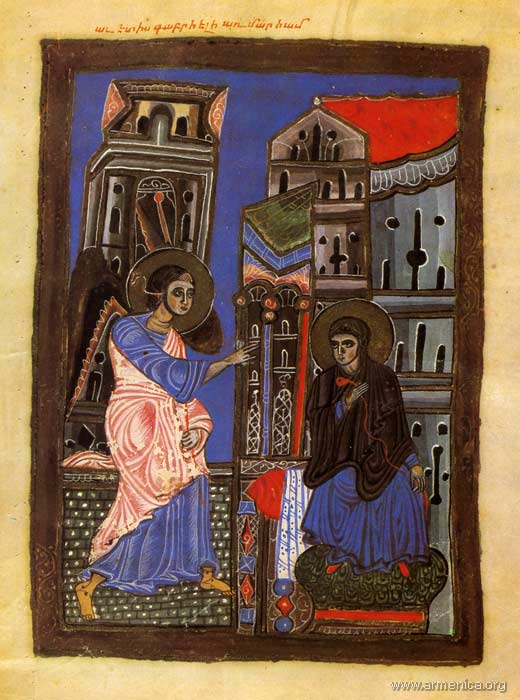
Scene of the annunciation by Grigor, 1232, Targmanchats Gospels, MS2743 Matenadaran collection.

The so-called Gospel of the Translators of 1232 (Matenadaran, Ms. 2743) was written by the scribe Tiratsi and illustrated by the painter Grigor Tsaghkogh. Inspired by the frescoes of the cave temples of neighboring Cappadocia, his works show a clear individuality: "the dramatic tension of the characters and the coloring where dark blues and purples dominate, with rare flashes of bright red and pink, are so impressive that certain inaccuracies in the design go unnoticed”.

The colophon of a manuscript produced in 1318 at Erzincan bears the following content: "Due to the difficult times, I had emigrated five times before being able to finish my manuscript...".

==== Ani ====
Still protected during the early period of the 13th century by the Zakarid dynasty, the capital of the kingdom of Ani was full of activities involving numerous economic occupations such as craftsmen, artisans and traders of diverse languages and cultural backgrounds. Cultural life was maintained there amidst numerous difficulties. Lydia Durnovo writes in her essay: “this middle class of the population, in constant expansion, naturally made its culture prevail over those of the aristocracy and the working classes. It didn't aspire to pomp and did not intend to spend large sums on the production of lavish manuscripts, but the laconic simplicity of folk art did not satisfy it either. This class had widened its horizon and its field of knowledge. It needed texts in the form of detailed narratives sprinkled with digressions and explanations. The illustrations were to hold the attention more by the variety of the motifs rather than by the beauty of the forms or the ornaments”.

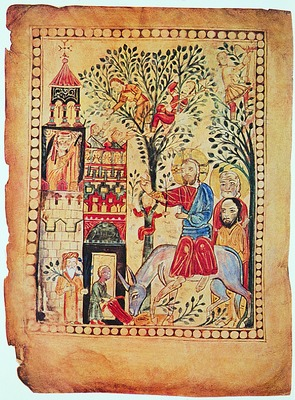
Triumphal entry into Jerusalem, page from the Ms. 6288, Horomos, 1211 AD.

Only two names of miniaturists from Ani have survived: Margare and Ignatios Horomostsi. The former decorated the Gospel of 1211 (known as the Haghpat Gospel, Matenadaran, Ms. 6288) copied at Haghpat Monastery, illustrated at the Bekhents Monastery and bound at the Horomos Monastery, near Ani; it is characterized by a thematic repertoire extended by the illustrations of the daily life contemporary to the miniaturist. The aspiration to realism is noticed especially in the treatment of the characters. It is especially noticeable in a single Gospel scene, the Entry of Christ into Jerusalem. The impressions experienced are reflected in the crowd massed to welcome Christ; and even a certain form of secularization is noticed in the treatment of the characters. The second painter, Ignatios, worked at the Armenian monastery of Horomos in the middle of the 13th century and witnessed the Mongol invasion. He left a manuscript that he illuminated in this colophon: "the manuscript was written at the painful and fatal time when Ani, the capital, was taken and when we witnessed countless destructions of cities and of the country ". In the work of Khatchikian, about "the Colophons of the Armenian manuscripts...of the fourteenth century", he noted that one can read these words which as a testament to the harshness of the period in which these painters lived, without ever interrupting their work; words added as a postscript: "Times are so hard that for four years I have been writing while resting my book on the palm of my hand".

Despite the poor living conditions, and the constant emigration from one place to another, calligraphers and miniaturists moved from school to school to keep up with their studies, and even into caves, like how the master Hovhannes Vanakan did during the Mongol invasion, not far from the fortress of Tavush.

==== Syunik ====
Syunik, a province in the southeast of Lake Sevan, is home to the regions where the last two great Armenian academies of the Middle Ages flourished before the foreign invasions: the university of Gladzor and the monastic university of Tatev. The founding of the school of Gladzor dates back to the second half of the 13th century. Young scholars from all over Armenia and even from Cilicia came to learn from the greatest scholars at the time. Two names stand out the most: Nerses Mchetsi and Essai Nchetsi; the first is the founder of this university, he had a great interest in Latin and Greek, and the second is a political figure and a master of rhetoric and philosophy. The school of calligraphy and illumination was well renowned. The miniatures bear the marks of ancient local traditions, influenced by paganism such as totems, allegories of good and evil, and mythological beings, such as sirens, griffins, wyverns, unicorns and dragons. The nature of these miniatures is represented in a realistic way. The Cilician influences assert themselves with the young painters who came with other secular traditions.

Mateos, a famously local-oriented artist, is the author of the Gospel illustrations of 1292 (Matenadaran, Ms. 6292). His work shows a particular ornamental richness: “the painter has a preference for large vegetal motifs and has a liking of illustrating elegant peacocks with magnificently outstretched tails in the foliage. These birds are represented in pairs, sometimes drinking from a water source and sometimes intertwining their graceful necks”.

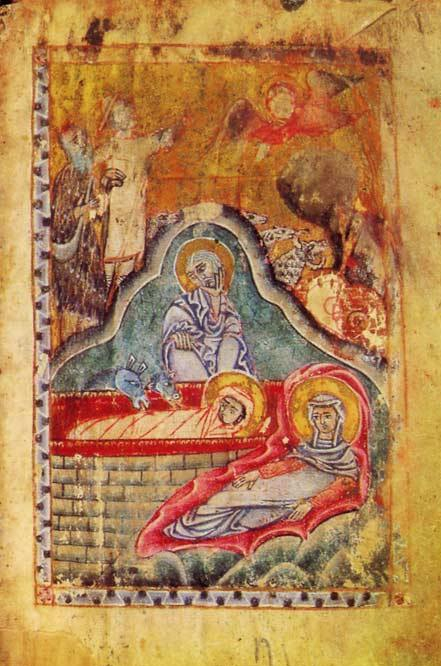
Birth of Jesus, from the Yerven, Matenadaran, Ms. 6792 New Testament, 1302 AD, Siunik', scribe and artist; Momik.

A multi-talented artist, Momik is famous for his intricate khachkars: he left carved stone stelae of unparalleled subtlety and extreme finesse. He is also a renowned architect and a miniaturist who also worked at the University of Gladzor. His work reflects new directions in the art of miniature painting. A certain lyricism and poetry of sensual and refined depth emerged from his style; “these new tendencies manifest themselves both in the graceful design of his khachkars, whose fine openwork carving manages to make one forget the hardness of the stone, and in his miniatures imprinted with the spontaneity typical of popular art. The Matenadaran has two manuscripts of Momik (Ms. 6792 and Ms. 2848). The miniaturist sometimes decorates the entire surface of the background with usually bluish semicircles, which resemble clouds and seem to symbolize the sacred character of the events represented. Momik's compositions emphasize symmetry and balance of proportions”.

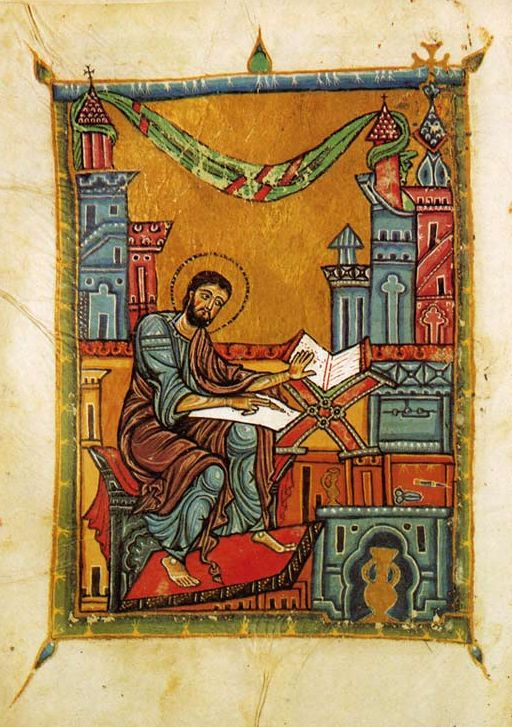
Page from Ms. 6289, Toros Taronatsi, 1318 AD.

Toros Taronatsi, an Armenian miniaturist and poet, was the most prolific painter of the school of Gladzor. He was a pupil of Essai Ntchetsi. At first, influenced by ancient pagan symbols, he then introduced new ornamentation of canon tables and marginal motifs of sirens, sometimes two-headed, serpents and dragons personifying evil, fighting among themselves, torturing their prey or, following a late Christian interpretation, getting struck down by military saints. The decoration of the leaves of the Eusbian canons in the Bible of 1318 (Matenadaran, Ms. 206) is so rich and abundant that there is barely room for the actual tables. In a second phase, Taronasti's art underwent the influence of Cilician illumination and the decorative element then took precedence in his miniatures: "the shapes, the types of motifs, the general arrangement of the frontispieces and the canons are inspired by Cilician models (Matenadaran, Ms. 6289). On the other hand, certain iconographic particularities, such as the way of treating the nursing mother of Jesus, attest that Taronatsi was familiar with Western art”.

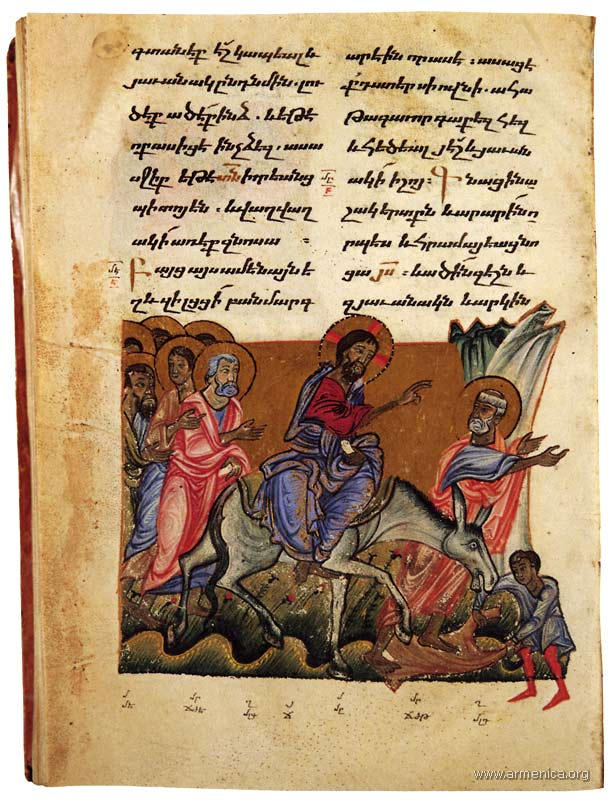
Entry of Jesus into Jerusalem, page from the MS. 212 Gospels, written and illuminated by Avag during his stay in Tabriz, Iran, 1337 AD.

Avag, an Armenian miniaturist, was an itinerant and eclectic painter. He traveled between Gladzor and its university, Cilicia for several years and also Persia. The Cilician influence is significant in the composition of his art which can be seen in a gospel he illustrated (Matenadaran, Ms. 7631) with Sarkis Pitsak. The Gospel of 1337 (Ms. 212) preserved in Matenadaran is decorated with numerous full-page miniatures, marginal scenes and miniatures inserted in the texts. These illustrations are replicas of Toros Roslin's illustrations. "It is precisely the combination of a refined style, bordering on mannerism, and a solemn austerity that make all the charming elements of these miniatures executed with a quite remarkable mastery".

In 1338, after the death of Essai Ntchesti, the University of Gladzor closed its doors; as a result, the university of Tatev influenced the academies under the lead of Grigor Tatevastsi, politician and philosopher, poet and painter. Miniatures of several subjects and biblical figures as well as illuminated title pages are found in a gospel he illustrated in 1378 (Ms. 7482). “Tatevatsi's painting can be recognized by the skilful use of elements borrowed from popular ornamentation. The artist fills the entire background with large motifs executed in muted, monochrome tones, they look like the carpets hung on the walls of houses, which gives the scenes represented an intimate character (Madonna and Child, Annunciation). The posture of the characters is embodied by its quiet majesty. The miniatures of Grigor are also similar to frescoes: the application of color is done in thick and matte touches".

During the periods of trouble and chaos Armenian monks were most often seen abandoning their monasticism and asceticism to become soldiers and this is found even in the themes of the miniatures. A mix of decorative elements, designs and colors of great diversity is usually noticed in the manuscripts. Besides the background, all the elements of the miniature, both in the architectural details and in the clothing, are dotted with small floral motifs which had led a gospel (Matenadaran, Ms. 6305) to be named The printed fabric manuscript. “The variety of the thematic repertoire, the expressiveness of the characters and the soft luminosity of the coloring make this manuscript a particularly sumptuous copy. The full-page figures of four holy warriors hold a great attention from scholars and researchers. Their presences seems to highlight their role as intercessors, necessary to the enslaved Armenian peoples”. But the deterioration of living conditions, and the political and economic troubles in the country forced many scriptoria to considerably reduce their capabilities at the end of the fourteenth and the beginning of the fifteenth centuries, the art of calligraphy and illumination survived only in remote monasteries in southern and eastern Armenia.

==== Vaspurakan ====
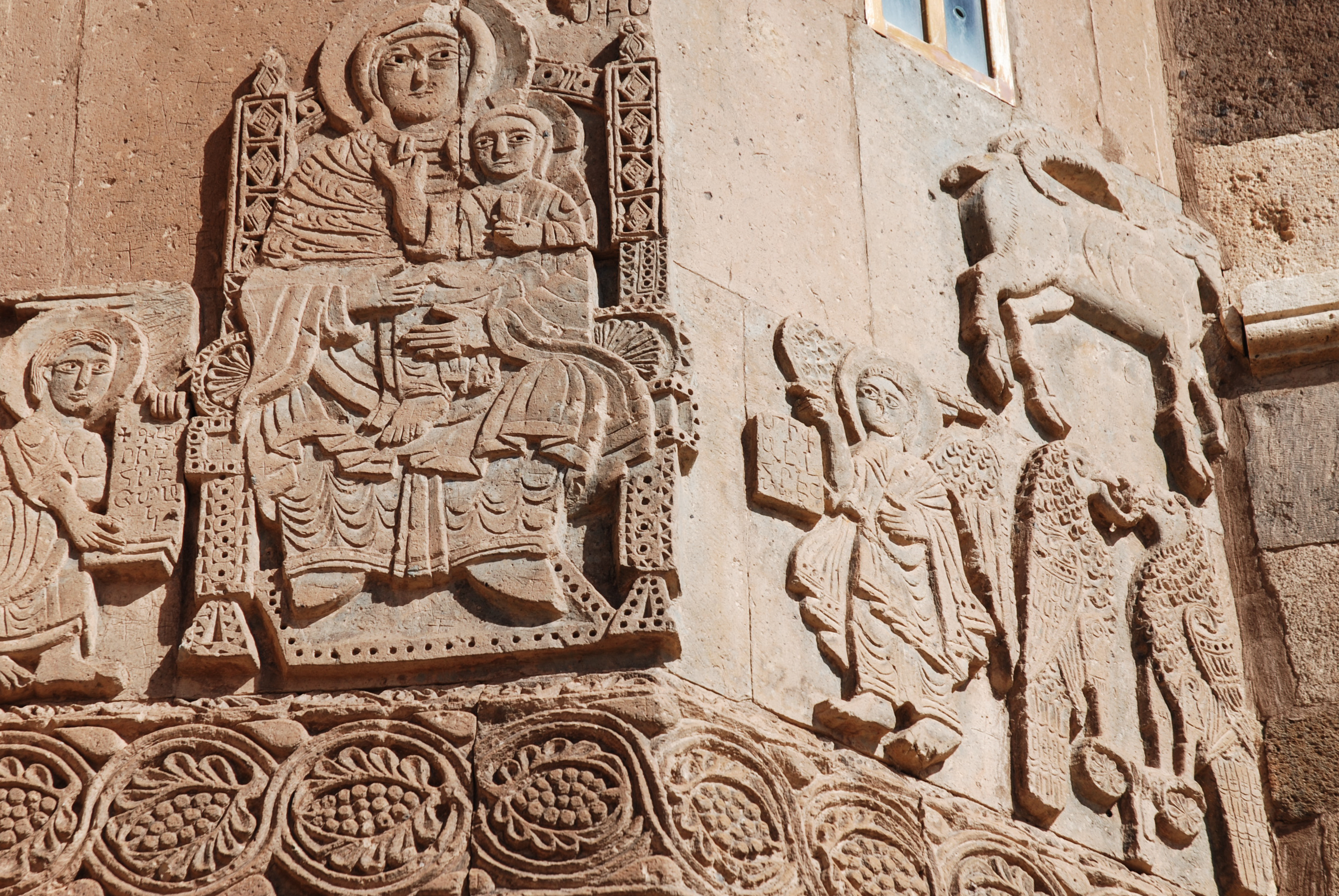
Frescoes and reliefs from the 10th-Century Akdamar Church, Lake Van, Western Armenia (now in Turkey).

The so-called Vaspurakan school was one of the main centers of Armenian art in the 13th and 14th centuries, nearly 1500 of its manuscripts have survived, with most of them containing miniatures.

The most frequent themes of illustrations are the Creation of the world, the Sacrifice of Abraham and the Apparition under the Oak of Mamre. The miniaturists continued the ancient local traditions which had found survival in the form of reliefs and frescoes like the ones in the Holy Cross Cathedral of Aghtamar of the 10th century. According to Sirarpie Der Nersessian, the introduction of Old Testament scenes as symbols of New Testament subjects appeared as early as the 9th century in Armenian art. This artistic representation in the reliefs is particularly visible in the scene of the Sacrifice of Abraham which led to an iconographic tradition of miniatures among the illuminators of the 13th and 14th centuries (Simeon Artchichetsi, Zakaria and Daniel of Uranc).

The lack of perspective, typical of medieval art, is accentuated in the case of Vaspurakan school Miniatures. Common characteristics of this style most notably include flat figurative representation and scenes arranged in a frieze: “the characters are generally represented frontally. Their gestures are abrupt, dynamic and so expressive that they sometimes evoke several movements instead of just one. The goal is to discover the idea that is the basis of the subject, to reveal its very essence, without worrying about the interpretation of the narrative or the potentially meaningful symbols that the scene may have”. The miniaturists of Vaspurakan paid little attention to the faithful reproduction of concrete details drawn from the observation of the real world. What seems to have concerned them the most is the rhythm. And it is through rhythm that they worked on the symbolism. “They illustrated several types of ideograms that reveal the hidden meaning of the scenes depicted. The overall harmony stems from the traditional arrangement of the figures and their rhythmic movements. This rhythm, which is not that of ordinary gestures, acquires a deep meaning of perpetual motion. The course of events with their external details and the idealist character of the gestures are relegated to the background, while their symbolic meaning becomes fundamental”.

The ornamentation of the Eusebian canons reveals a mastery in its execution in the form of horseshoe arches adorned with geometric and vegetal motifs. The silhouettes of both real and mythological beings were often intertwined by the vegetal motifs and the complex scrolls. Beneath the conventional symbolism in the treatment of the characters shines through the spontaneity following the popular way of thinking at the time. This principle of ornamental art addresses religious themes with simplicity and lack of formalism. It is this particularity that gives it its place in the history of Armenian miniature. Its eastern influence brings it closer to the art of Cappadocia, the art of Arab countries and Syria, Iran, as well as Mesopotamia; which constitutes a vast set of different but related cultures.

==== Nakhichivan ====
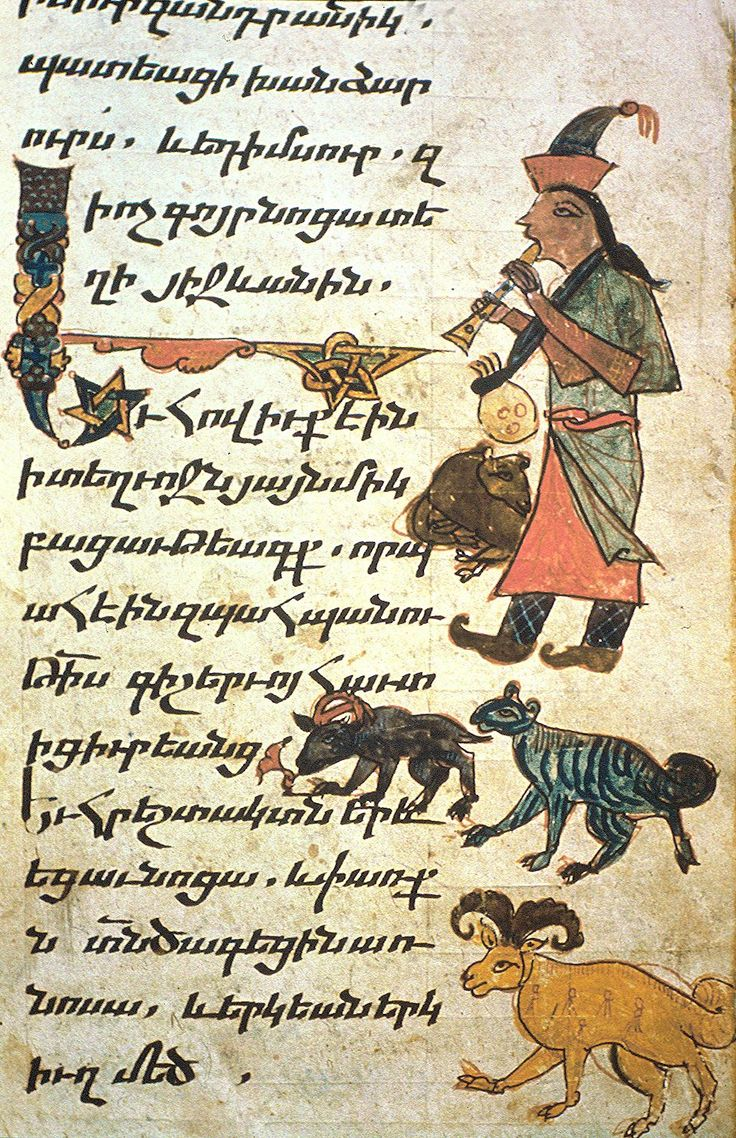
Page from MS 3722, Nakhijevan, 1304 AD

The influence of the art of Vaspurakan goes beyond the bordering territories. This is noticed in the presence of a strong link between the Vaspurakan school and the school of the previously Armenian-populated Nakhichevan. Two illuminated manuscripts are often cited to describe the characteristics of the art of this region: the first is a Gospel (Matenadara, Ms. 3722) copied in 1304 by the artist Simeon and another Gospel (Matenadaran, Ms. 2930) transcribed in 1315 by a miniaturist (and scribe) named Margaret. In the first manuscript of 1304, the subjects placed in the margins are treated with extreme simplicity that they are almost reduced to the status of symbols. “The Baptism of Christ is symbolized by a cup containing myrrh. The artist chose to represent exulting shepherds and frolicking lambs for his nativity while for the Last Supper he painted a chalice and two fish; a scene with multiple figures par excellence, and the entry into Jerusalem is represented with only three figures, including Christ mounted on a mule. This pictorial style undoubtedly goes back to ancient traditions, present in particular in the famous Echmiadzin Gospel of 989. This manuscript is abundantly illustrated with figures of animals, ornamental motifs and symbols of pagan origin”. Lydia Durnovo describes the art of the miniaturist as such: "He introduced various ornamentation of the margins motifs of a wide variety, among which there are an abundance of animals, birds, mermaids and human faces thus completing the thematic range and developing the form of the marginal symbols. (...) His work is not precise, but full of vigor and passion, energy and skill. The dynamism of the artist's brush seems to be embodied in the dynamism of the subjects”.

The 1315 manuscript contains an extended series of Gospel cycle miniatures, which is more characteristic of the Vaspurakan school than of the Nakhichevan school. The first miniature deals with the theme of Abraham's Sacrifice, borrowed from the Old Testament. The Descent of the Holy Spirit on the apostles is the last scene represented. According to the works of Akopian and Korkhmazian: “The iconography has a number of archaic features, especially in the miniatures representing the Nativity, the Resurrection and the Entombment. The artist used for his compositions the most bare variants, which take on a monumental character for his art. The colors are applied in thick and generous layers. The dominant tones are red, velvety green and sienna”.

==== Artsakh, Utik and the Lake Sevan basin ====
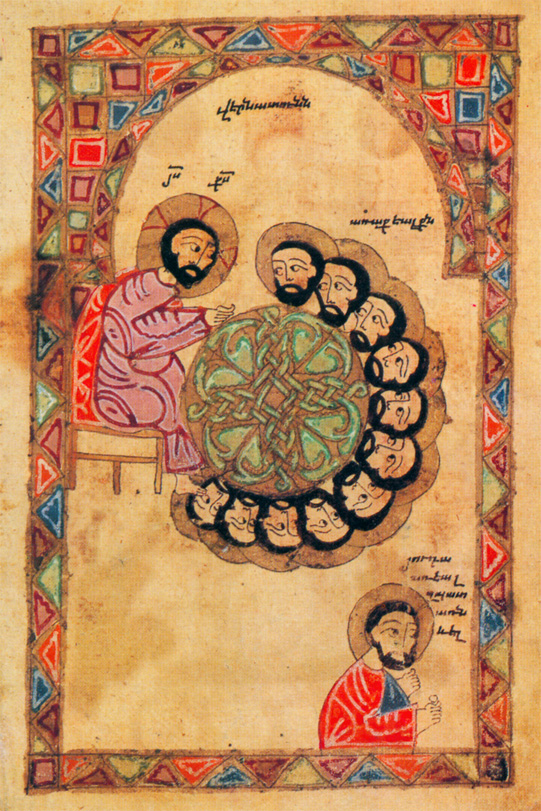
The last supper, MS 313, Matenadaran.

The manuscripts illuminated by the Khachen painters have been preserved in quite a large number. This is largely because the principality of Kachen managed to obtain a lot of them during the reign of the Zakarians, which was a reign of relative autonomy under the Mongol occupation. Thus, the art of writing and illumination flourished in their vassal principalities of northeastern Armenia. The Gospel of 1224 (Matenadaran, Ms. 4832), a notable example of these manuscripts is known for its miniatures that belong to the "composite trend", a new trend which is a mixture of aristocratic and folk elements, coinciding with the emergence of urban culture and characterized by the combination of a certain deep use of expressions and very simple technical means: "a maximum of results for a minimum of expenditure".

One manuscript which dates from before 1261: Ms. 378 (Matenadaran) was illustrated by Toros (not to be confused with Toros Taronatsi and Toros Roslin), in the same region, but some of its miniatures were added later. "The manuscripts produced in the southern regions of Artsakh and in the Lake Sevan basin are of great iconographic interest and artistic value. Their illustrations differ significantly from the miniatures of other Armenian schools, which is particularly evident when compared to the productions of the Vaspurakan school. In the manuscripts of the Artsakh-Sevan group, the Sacrifice of Abraham, an Old Testament theme dear to the Vaspurakan painters, to which it serves as a prologue, is completely absent, as is the traditional miniature of Christ in Majesty and the thematic cycles of the Last Judgment, the Advent of the Son of Man and the Miracles of Christ. There are also no details of the secular daily life. The most common themes of this school are those of the childhood of Jesus (the Nativity, the Presentation of Jesus at the Temple, the Massacre of the Innocents and Jesus among the Doctors), the parable of the Wise and Foolish Virgins, original sin and the betrayal of Judas. In other words, instead of the narrative subjects and allegorical themes often associated with the Old Testament the painters of this school emphasize the creation of the world, original sin and the dramatic events of the Gospel". One of the particularities worthy of note among others is a representation of the Last Supper. Painted in a unique way, the illuminators chose to show the heads of the apostles nimbed, while Judas alone, isolated from the group, is represented full-length. This way of treating the subject remains unique in the history of medieval art. Another peculiarity scholars are often interested in is a scene of the Annunciation, where an angel with spread wings playing the flute in the clouds can be found. Thus, the painters of this school are the only ones to represent the scene in this unique way.

Strongly influenced also by the classical art of Syunik, represented here by Momik and Toros Taronatsi, as well as by the Vaspurakan school, the miniatures of Artsakh, Utik and the Lake Sevan basin combine the simplicity of the decorative gesture with the appeal of the primitivism of folk origin. Despite the use of contradictory pictorial principles, this group of painters managed to create a surprising stylistic harmony. In contrast to the miniatures of Vaspurakan, which are sparer in style, the works of the Artsakh-Sevan painters are finely worked and carefully finished. Large colored frames, where the miniatures are found, further enhance the page of the manuscript: "there is a rigorous coordination in space between the silhouettes and the objects. All are arranged within a single spatial zone. When one looks at the miniatures one cannot help but be reminded of carpets, as if each of the motifs with which the overall surface is studded had an independent existence".

According to the specialists of Armenian miniatures of Matenadaran, "the decorative principle clearly prevails over the figurative. The Artsakh-Sevan painters emphasize symbolic attributes, such as the flute of the Annunciation, the twelve partridges which, in the Presentation of Jesus in the Temple, symbolize the twelve apostles, and the cross placed on the table of the Last Supper, an allusion to the sacrifice of Christ. These details serve to illuminate the meaning of the scene depicted while also playing the role of decorative elements. This process is characteristic of the Vaspurakan school. In spite of the stylistic peculiarities that differentiate them, the various trends and schools of miniature painting in Greater Armenia in the 13th and 14th centuries have in common their fidelity to local traditions and folk art. The Byzantine influence, which played such a great role in the formation of many national schools in the Middle Ages, never prevailed in Armenian art. Its ascendancy was more actively exerted only on the painters of Cilician Armenia".

==== Cilician miniatures ====
Map of Cilician Armenia, from 1199 to 1375.

Armenian cultural life slowed down at the end of the 11th and beginning of the 12th centuries, but it experienced a new boom in the 13th and 14th centuries, not only in the country itself but also in the new regions to which ethnic Armenians had migrated. Cilicia was the most vital place among these regions to Armenian civilization.

==== Beginnings ====
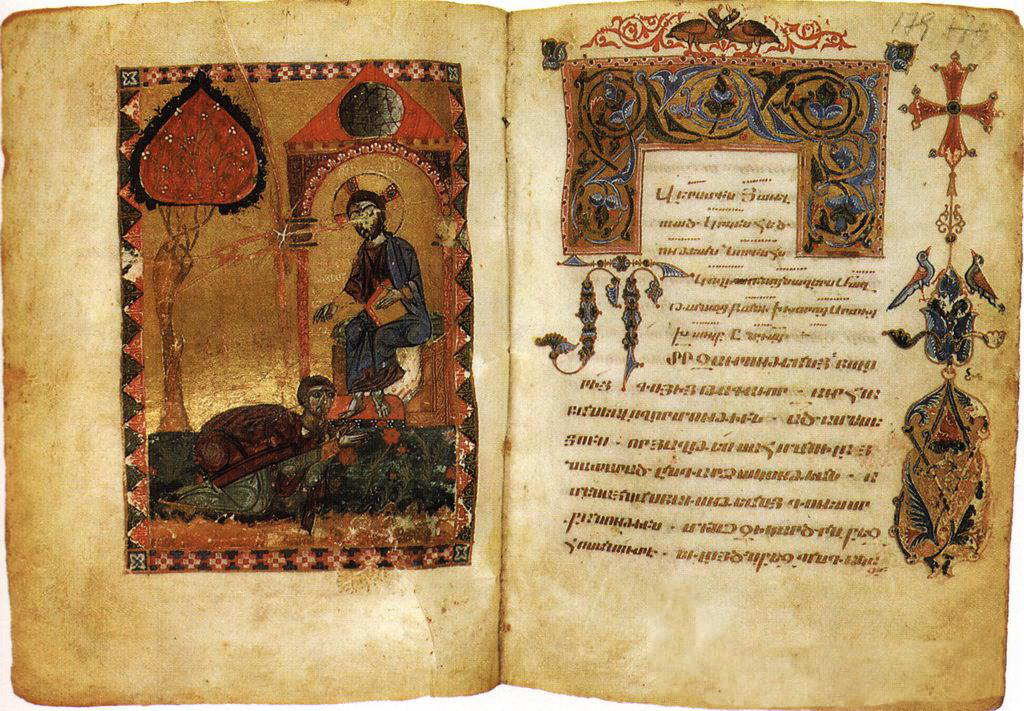
Book of Lamentations by Grigor Narekatsi, Ms. 1568 (1173 AD), Matenadaran, Yerevan, Armenia.

The origins of Cilician miniature go back to the Armenian miniatures of the 11th century. According to the colophons found in these manuscripts, they were taken from Armenia to Cilicia. There, they enjoyed a certain prestige and subsequently served as models for Cilician miniaturists, with their simplicity and their sober but intense colors and their characters with majestic and voluminous silhouettes. The Cilician painting had its roots in the stylistic peculiarities of the art of Greater Armenia, but the new historical and social, political and economic conditions could not but shake up the cultural and pictorial principles of the region.

The changes affected the form, structure and style of the art form. Despite the fact that in the 12th and 13th centuries, the formats of the manuscripts were more manageable, and easy to hold in the hand as they no longer rested as they did in the 10th and 11th centuries on the ambon of the churches or in the sacristies. The ornamentation did become richer, and the space previously given to the miniatures was increased to full pages or the middle of the text. From the middle of the 13th century, there was a dramatic increase in the number of illuminated manuscripts. Bibles, lectionaries and psalters were starting to get illuminated. Moreover, not only did the style got refined, it became richer and more ornamental in nature. According to one of the specialists of Cilician miniature in the Matenadaran, "The thick layers of paint in large sizes and the small range of the colors reminded me of frescoes. The Cilician miniature of the 13th century is, on the contrary, a book painting in its own right: it is made to be looked at closely, because this is the only way to fully appreciate the elegant and complex lines, the finesse of the ornaments and the richness shown by the range of colors. It collaborates shades of thick blue with bright red, the refinement of purplish mauves, the delicacy of pink and pale green, light blue and the shimmer of gold".

Several schools or artistic centers can be distinguished, including Hromgla, a fortified monastery located on the banks of the Euphrates, it was the seat of the Catholicos, the head of the Armenian Church; Drazark, Akner and Grner near Sis, the capital of the kingdom and Skevra in the lands of the Hethumids, of which the Skevra Evangeliary (in the National Library of Warsaw) is an example (late eleventh century). Among the dignitaries, some names appear such as Nerses the Gracious, Nerses Lambronatsi, the catholicos Constantine I Bartzabertsi and archbishop Ovannes. According to Drampian: "the art of illumination in Cilicia knew its greatest splendor between 1250 and 1280. But this period of flowering was prepared by a century and a half of evolution and continued for another half-century, although with less brilliance. The Cilician style began to define itself at the end of the 12th century and asserted itself in the 13th century, especially after 1250".

The formation of the style arose in the treatment of the silhouettes as well as in the faces of the evangelists. The painters seem to have wanted to render the volumes. Subsequently, the folds of the clothes allow the academics to guess the shapes of the human figures, as a result, it's known that their proportions are less stylised. Additionally, the vigor animated the colors took hold of intense blues, the greens got more brilliant, the reds less carmine and the gold increased in use. The ornamental motifs also acquired finesse and intricacy. The peculiarities of the Cilician style are very discreetly manifested in the Gospel of 1237 (Ms. 7700) kept in the Matenadaran. According to TobIrina Drampian; "The coloring of the miniatures (Eusbian canons, portraits of the evangelists and title pages) is still far from the generous and bright range that will be the main characteristic of Cilician painting in its period of full maturity,". She continues with an analysis of the colors with depth and reveals what will soon be this illumination: "the tones are soft, quite a few, with the predominance of finely shaded green, light blue, pale yellow and mauve combined with gold. She concludes on the subject of the harmony of the nature of the art which is described in detail: "The proportions of the canons do not possess the perfect harmony which will characterize the Cilician miniature twenty years later. The ornamentation does not yet have that subtlety which will bring it closer to gold smithery. The iconographic details merge in voluminous masses and one does not find the diversity and the ornamental richness which will make the splendor of the Cilician manuscripts in their period peak. The birds that surround the arches of the canons have not yet acquired the realism that they will gain in later manuscripts”. The middle of the 13th century was a period of new phases in the search for pictorial elements. The forms came out of the rigidity of the medieval canons, the painting depth in the composition widened, and the characters acquired curves, rich modeling and more natural postures.

==== Toros Roslin ====
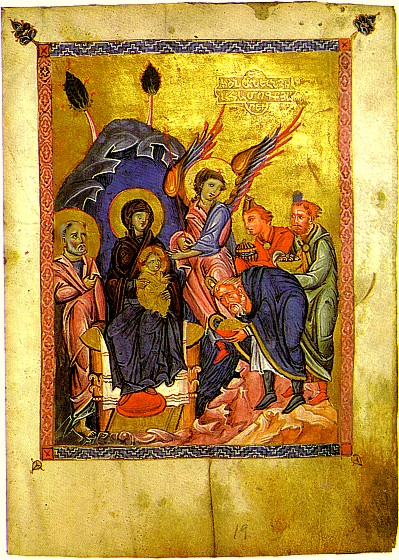
Page from Armenian manuscripts illuminated by Toros Roslin.

This trend of realism was asserted with the coming of Toros Roslin, (disciple of a man named Kirakos who was his immediate predecessor, his older contemporary and probably his master). Few of his biographical details are known, the same is true for other painters of this period. According to the colophons from 1250 to 1260 AD, he worked in Hromgla. He was considered the most prominent miniaturist of the scriptorium while enjoying the patronage of the Catholicos Constantine I. There are currently only seven manuscripts signed by him. All of them were produced in Hromgla between 1256 and 1268. The latest and most well-preserved of the seven surviving manuscripts is the Malatia Gospel of 1268 (Matenadaran, Ms. 10675). This lean for realism is accompanied by a richer and more complex rendering of space: successive plans in the layout of the characters, overlays of the spatial zones, multiple angles of view, and even visual illusions. "These new trends and pictorial techniques are the result of a conception of the world that has evolved and moved away from religious values; this concept epitomize the entire cilican culture of this period. Without departing from the main principles of medieval art, Roslin was able to expand them [these new trends] considerably compared to his predecessors and even to his contemporaries, and was able to give his painting a dynamism that does not, however, withdraw its sublime character".

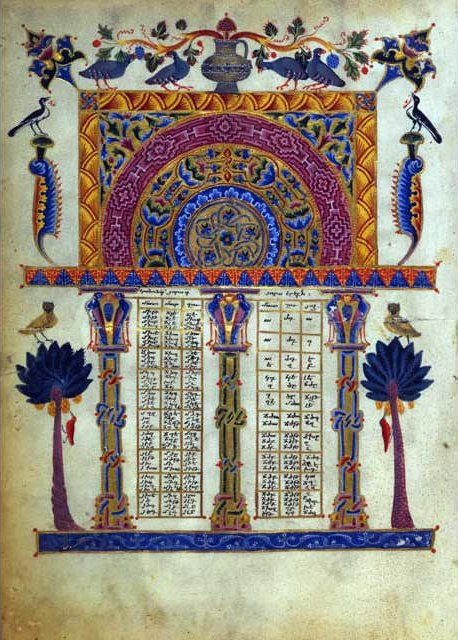
Canon table painted by Toros Roslin.

Roslin was the leading artist of his time, notable for his use of a wide range of bright colors and his choices of color plays, most notably allying blue with gold enhanced by a linear white speckled with red and pale mauves with velvety greens. The figures found in his miniatures are known for their realistic proportions, something rare during the medieval period. He seems to have borrowed the motifs and ornaments he uses from everyday life. “A serene solemnity emits from Roslin's paintings, a strange fusion of peaceful joy and slight melancholy. The aesthetic ideal of the artist shines through in the regularity of the facial features of his characters, a reflection of their spiritual beauty. In his miniatures, Jesus does not have the majestic and severe expression of transcendence. His face is imbued with gentleness and nobility, traits that must have belonged to the inner world of the artist himself. Roslin wanted to make the image of Christ more human and accessible to his contemporaries”. Another anonymous manuscript of Matenadaran has been attributed to Toros Roslin, but only 38 of its pages remain. These are fragments of the Gospel of 1266 (Ms. 5458) executed at the monastery of Hromgla, at the order of King Hethum I. "The calligraphy is of great beauty: the subtly drawn black and gold characters, initials and finely ornamented marginal patterns are arranged on the page with remarkable taste and sensitivity. There are only two marginal miniatures representing Christ. Their technical perfection exudes a deep spirituality. All these qualities suggest that this manuscript was one of the most beautiful specimens of Cilician art," says Irina Drampian in her study.

The classical period of Cilician illumination is represented by the art of Roslin and the painters of his generation. The next stage, 10 or 15 years after Roslin's last known manuscript, will be a period of the upheaval of the historical conditions. The last two decades marked the end of the peak of the Cilician state. It will be followed by a decline, albeit a slow but harsh one. The Egyptian Mamluks devastated the country and plundered the Hromgla monastery in 1292. The painters who followed went in the direction of pictorial realism and neglected the ideal of elegance that distinguished the art from their artistic predecessor. Drampian notes: "the faces of their characters sometimes reflect a certain rudeness. The silhouettes are stretched and appear distorted in comparison with those of Roslin, whose proportions had something of a Hellenic character".

==== Cilician miniatures after Toros Roslin ====
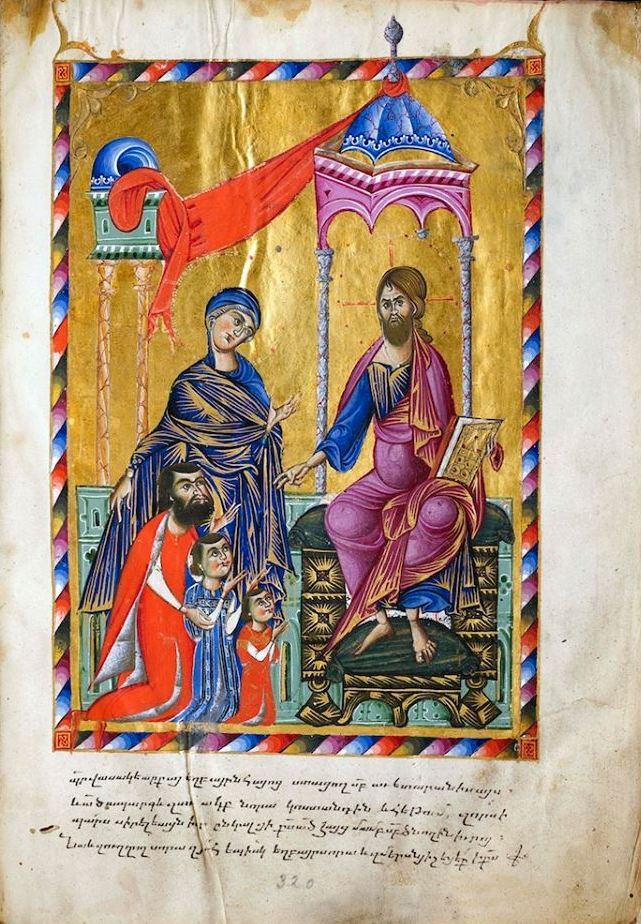
Vasak and his sons kneeled before Christ, Jerusalem, Armenian Patriarchate Library, Ms. 2568, known as the "Gospel of Prince Vasak", 1268–1285 AD.

When the end of the “classical” period arrived, another trend is known as the "Armenian baroque" appeared at the beginning of the 1280s. The manuscripts of this period were executed in monasteries located near the city of Sis. The Lectionary (Matenadaran, Ms. 979) of 1286 is the most lavish and richly illustrated manuscript of this period in the history of Armenian illumination. Commissioned by the Crown Prince (the future Hethum II to whom also belonged the Gospel of Malatia of Toros Roslin), this manuscript is adorned with miniatures on almost all of its pages, the number of which exceeds four hundred. According to Drampian: "The manuscript reflects the new orientations taken by Cilician painting from the 1280s onwards. There is a convulsive and dramatic expressiveness. These features are reflected in the general structure of the miniature as well as in detail elements, such as the shape of the silhouettes, the contour lines and the refinement of the intense and vibrant tones". The distinctly oriental trend asserted itself, accentuating the ornamental and picturesque side of the painters' works. There is a place for diversity, fantasy and boldness in the richness of the illustrations, reflecting the contacts of the Armenian miniaturists of Cilicia with the art of other nations. An example is in the miniature of Jonas thrown into the sea: the treatment of the waves, in the form of deep spirals, resembles Chinese engravings and drawings.

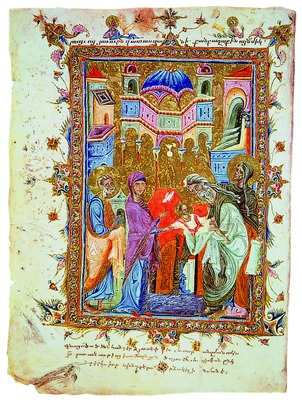
Presentation of Jesus at the temple, Lectionary of Hethum II, Matenadaran, Ms. 979.

Another Gospel (Matenadaran, Ms. 9422), whose original colophon was lost and replaced in the 14th century, recounts the turbulent history of the manuscript when it was in the monastery of Saint John the Holy Precursor of Mush. Iconographer Irina Drampian reports the story as such: "In the mid-14th century, the monks of this monastery were forced to hide a series of manuscripts, including this Gospel (Ms. 9422), to save them from strangers. They only opened their hiding place several years later and found that many manuscripts had gotten moldy and could not be read, so they buried them. Fortunately, a certain deacon named Simeon got wind of the matter, dug up the manuscripts, gave them away for restoration, then returned them to the monastery of Mush. Despite all these misfortunes, this Gospel retains an astonishing freshness, shimmering and vibrant colors, and we admire the aesthetics of its miniatures which are among the most poetic of the book art in Armenia". These monks had a lot of idiosyncrasies in their imagination, and it is not always easy to decipher their symbolism. "There is no doubt that the Cilician miniaturists knew the writings of Nerses the Gracious, since he was destined for them. But they were careful not to follow the prescriptions exactly. They did not always take into account the symbolic meaning attributed to certain motifs and grouped them according to their own fantasy, so as to obtain purely decorative effects. If the birds that quench their thirst in the water of a basin are the souls thirsty for immortality, if the pomegranates that hide the sweetness of their fruits under a bark symbolize the goodness of the prophets, if the slender palms represent the righteousness that rises to the sky, it is more difficult to explain the presence in the canons of elements such as a human silhouette with a monkey or goat head that holds a flower or a horn of abundance and dancers or naked horsemen, etc. life that bubbled around artists, with its circus performances, its mysteries, its hunting. They are also certainly the fruit of the fertile imagination of illuminators".

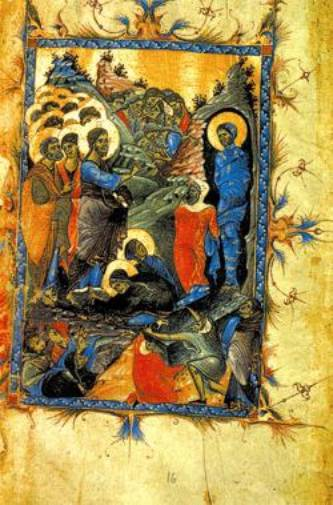
The Resurrection of Lazarus, end of the 13th c., Matenadaran Ms. 9422

Another Gospel entered the history of the Armenian books under the name of the Gospel of the Eight Painters (Ms. 7651). It is one of the most famous Cilician art monuments preserved in the Matenadaran, due to the character of its illustrations. No full-page thumbnail, but horizontal stripes; a rarity in Armenian illuminated manuscripts, which denotes a Byzantine influence. Cilician scribe Aevtis probably copied it in Sis at the end of the 13th century. In a 1320 colophon, the bishop of Sevastus, Stepanus, the second owner of the manuscript which he had received as a gift from King Oshin, recounts the history of this Gospel: "I, the unworthy Stepanus, bishop of Sevastus, pastor and lost sheep, mediocre author (of this inscription), went to Cilicia, blessed country of God, to worship the relics of St. Gregory and received there a welcome full of esteem and respect from Patriarch Constantine and King Oshin. And the pious king Oshin wanted to give me a gift, unworthy of me, and, despising temporal property, I desired to possess a gospel. On the king's order, I entered the reserve of the Palace where the holy books were gathered, and I liked it among all, because it was of a beautiful quick writing and decorated with polychrome images, but it was unfinished: one part was finished, another part was only drawn and many spaces remained untouched. I took the manuscript with great joy, went in search of a skilled artist and found Sarkis, said Pitsak, a virtuous priest who was very competent in painting. And I gave him 1,300 drachmas, the fruit of my honest work, and he accepted. With extreme care, he achieved and completed the missing illustrations and their gilding, to my delight. All was completed in the year 769 (1320 of the Armenian calendar), in bitter, difficult and terrible times, which I consider unnecessary to speak of...”. Pitsak remained a very skillful painter. He enjoyed great prestige among the miniaturists of the Vaspurakan school of the fifteenth and sixteenth centuries. He imposed it by the ornamental richness of his painting, more familiar and more accessible, it is true, to the artists of the people than by the research and finesse of the miniatures of the 13th century. This painter, rather cold, does not take into account all the novelties introduced in the illumination by Roslin and his successors. For the iconography analyst Irina Drampian: "his miniatures have no architectural elements or landscapes. The silhouettes are arranged on a gold background dotted with ornamental motifs. The characters are not really treated in flat figuration, but the painter has no concern to render the volume of the human body, nor to give the silhouettes natural poses. Movements are conventional and not very expressive, while the modeling of faces is obtained by a wide use of graphic lines more than by the play of color. The contours have lost all expressiveness and all stylistic character, while the shapes have become heavier. The shades of mauve, lilac and soft green have completely disappeared from the color range to make way for colors without shades. Bright red is associated with blue and gray brown, and gold is widely used".

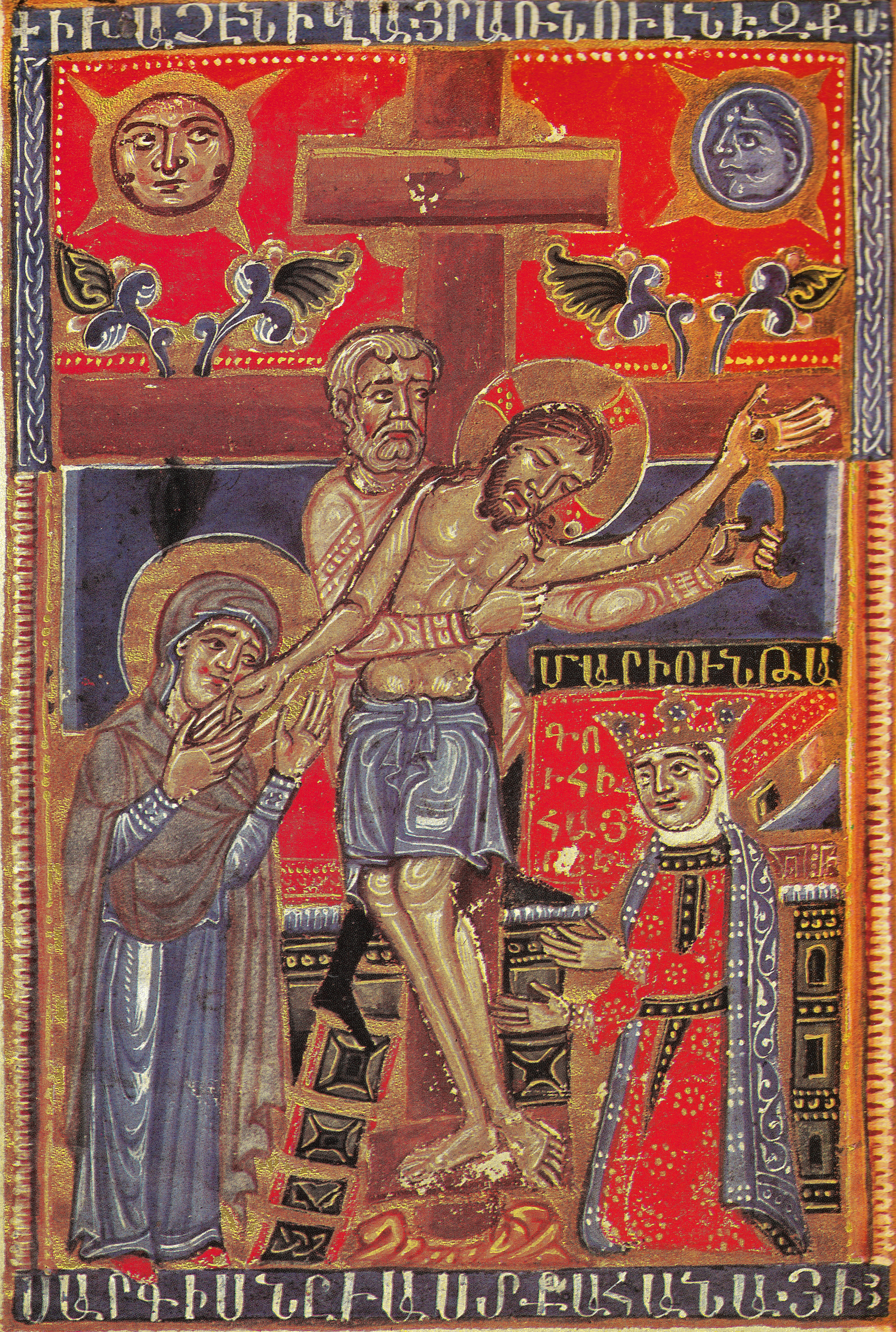
Page illuminated by Sargis Pitsak. Crucifixion of Jesus.

The work of these miniaturists marks the end of the golden age of Cilician illumination. Its history suffered a sudden break at the beginning of the 14th century. Toros Roslin's simple style was no longer fashionable. The illuminators of the 14th century got heavily influenced by the iconography of the East. "This abrupt turn in the art of the book in Cilicia coincides with dramatic events that were upsetting the political and social life of the country. The devastating incursions of the Egyptian Mamluks dealt a fatal blow to Cilicia, already weakened by internal strife, causing the Kingdom to fall at the end of the 14th century." Sarkis Pitsak is therefore the last great Cilician painter and the most fruitful, he illustrated with his hand more than 32 manuscripts.

==== Miniatures of the Armenian diaspora ====
For centuries, Armenians fled wars and invasions that struck their country. Among the surviving miniatures, a number come from the "Armenian colonies", that is to say, the different regions of the world where Armenians had settled temporarily, and sometimes even permanently. Countries that have welcomed ethnic Armenians include Greece, Italy, Iran, Russia, Bulgaria, Romania, Poland, India, Egypt, and many other countries. As a result, the Armenians came into contact with the art of the countries where they had found refuge, but they still maintained their national traditions. Of these numerous colonies, the Crimean one remained one of the most important and it reached its full bloom in the 14th and 15th centuries.

==== Crimea ====
Three hundred Armenian manuscripts from Crimea are in the Matenadaran; these works are at the crossroads of traditions, schools and various trends. The influence of Greek and Italian cultures is dominant because they are known through the emigrants from these countries who settled in Crimea. According to Emma Korkhmazian, "the art of the book shows a certain eclecticism at first. But over time, the Armenians of Crimea have formed their own characteristics, such as the association of the visual layout and the painted miniature in the same manuscript: next to the polychrome miniatures, the ornamental patterns are colored in only one or two tones applied in light gradient. The colors of the miniatures are slightly muted. They are laid in thick, compact layers. The most common combination is dark blue and mauve, while red, yellow and ochre are used only in moderation. The most representative painters of these two trends are Avetis, Arakel, Kirakos and Stepanos. This school is characterized on the one hand by the pasty application of color, a pictorial manner without great finesse and a tendency to simplify the shapes, but also by a great thoroughness in the treatment of the characters and especially of their faces". The art of the Paleologian renaissance has left its mark on the school of Crimea.

The Gospel of 1332 (Matenadaran, Ms. 7664), copied and illustrated in Surkhat (modern Staryi Krym) bears the imprint of this Byzantine influence which demonstrates freedom and boldness, with its desire to accurately interpret the textures and volumes, its ability to place the characters in the most varied movements and postures adds to the brilliance of its dynamism: "the spirit and enthusiasm of some miniatures makes them real scenes of genre. We think in particular of the episode of the Merchants driven from the Temple, the cycle dedicated to the life of John the evangelist and the Passion of Christ. The slightly elongated oval shape of the faces, their delicate model, their soft and almost dull colors, light shadows of a gloomy green, are all unusual elements for Armenian miniatures. They resemble the Byzantine or southern Slavic models of the early 14th century. Each miniature stands out against the whiteness of the background with a sharpness and shine reminiscent of easel painting."

In 1375, many new exiled emigrants from the Armenian kingdom of Cilicia arrived in Crimea, with them a large number of manuscripts, but most notably the Gospel of the Eight Painters, the Gospel of Smbat, and a manuscript illustrated by Sarkis Pitsak. Miniaturists in Crimea added their own new miniatures to these manuscripts. The most notable of these miniaturists is the 14th-century painter Hovhanes, his style was clearly influenced by Italian art, as can be seen by his use of chromatic contrasts and the play of the light shadows to render the volume.

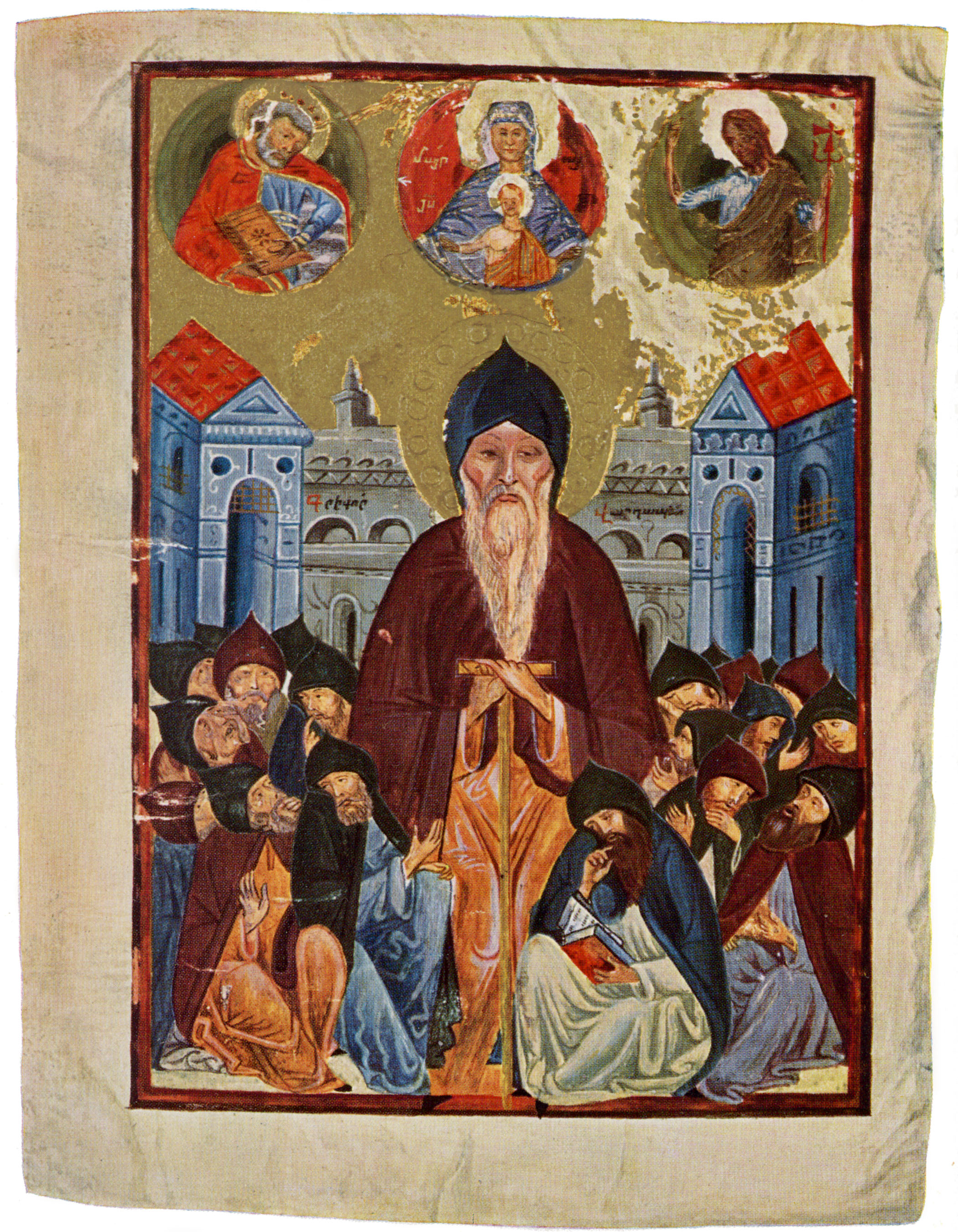
Commentary of David's psalms, portrait of Grigor Tatevatsi, Ms. 1203, Matenadaran.

Among the Matenadaran manuscripts that have not preserved a colophon are three 14th-century Gospels (Ms. 318, Ms. 4060 and Ms. 7699) whose origin has recently been located in Surkhat in Crimea. The style of their miniatures is a synthesis of Cilician traditions and the style of late Byzantine art, with its Hellenistic elements and its aspiration for a more realistic and pictorial rendering. The use of chiaroscuro dominates the play of contrasts, and the innovative spirit is revealed in the style of the figures: "their collected, almost palpable figures are built with more freedom. Their faces with animated features and the general softness of the shapes bring the illustrations of these three Gospels closer to the painting of the Southern Slavs contemporary to their time".

Among the distinguished works, one is about Grigor Tatevatsi in a Gospel (Matenadaran, Ms. 1203). The rector of the university of Tatev is here painted in the middle of his class of students, with a church in the background. His facial features are very detailed, and personalized and correspond to a written physical description of Grigor Tatevatsi. A notable element of this manuscript is the rare and striking presence of a true portrait at the end of the 14th century. The Armenian art of portraiture dates back to the 5th century, according to Agathange and Movses Khorenatsi in the manuscripts of the copyists (not preserved) of the Armenian illuminations; However, the oldest of the preserved portraits dates back to the year of 1007 AD. This portrait commissioned by Hovhannes is preserved in the national library of the city of Venice (Gospel Ms. 887).

==== Other colonies ====
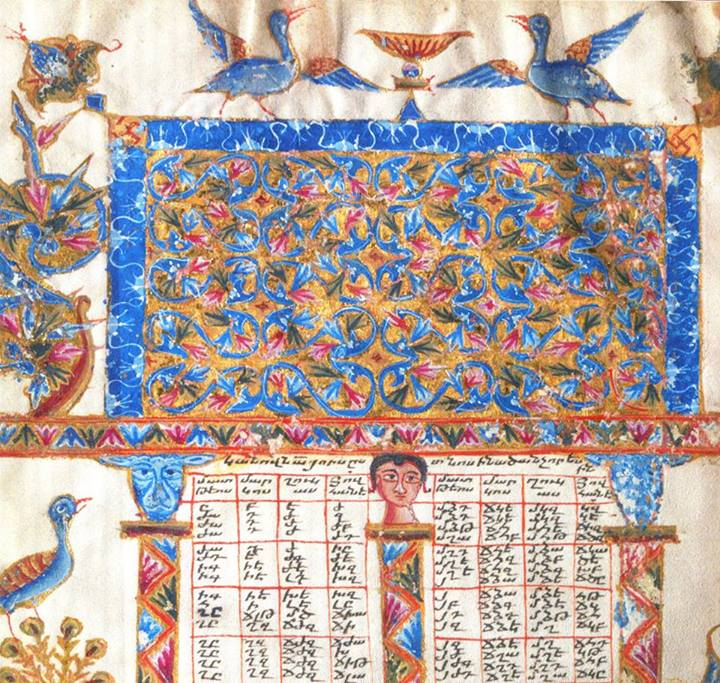
Armenian Gospel of Gladzor, 1307. Italy, St. Ghazar, Mekhitarians old manuscripts library, Ms. 1917

Apart from Crimea, the oldest and most important manuscript is a part of the Bible copied and illustrated in Bologna (Matenadaran, Ms. 2705) which dates from the late 12th century, it is known for its rich ornamentation. According to the latest research. After the fall of Constantinople in 1204, a number of painters emigrated to Italy, "where they exercised until the beginning of the 14th century a significant influence on the development of the arts. The illustrations in the Bologna Bible are of refined elegance and bear witness to a certain artistic taste. The tones are soft and very nuanced, the shapes are modeled with great finesse of detail, while the compositions reveal an unusual mastery. The Western contribution is manifested in the appearance of new subjects, such as the Apocalypse".

From the 15th century onwards, without being totally assimilated into Catholicism, many Armenians converted but remained faithful to their original culture. In these vital periods, the first printed Armenian book was published in 1511 in Venice. At the beginning of the 18th century, an Armenian monastery was founded by Mkhitar Sebastatsi on San Lazzaro degli Armeni, an island not far from Venice. Its congregation had and still has a rich library of a collection of manuscripts, a museum and a publishing house that make this place an island of Armenian culture on the territory of Italy.

== Decline ==
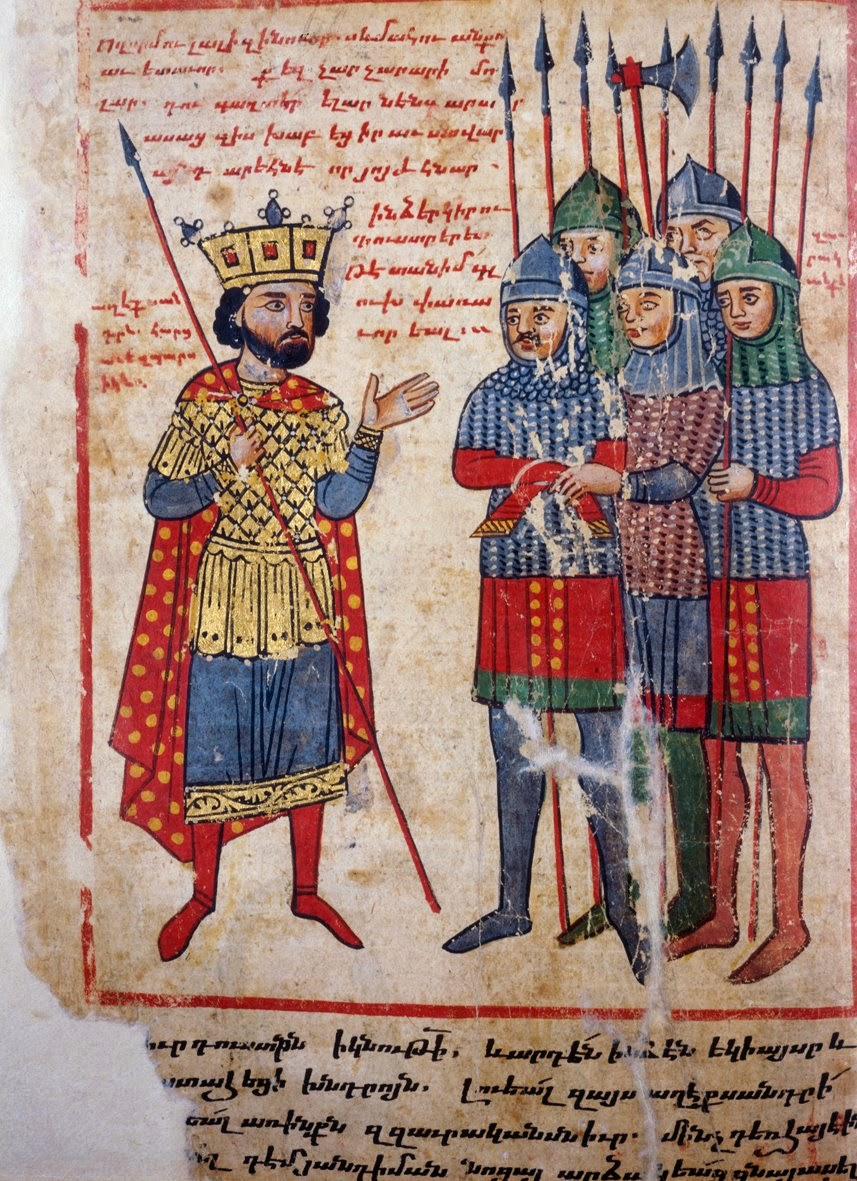
Page from the Alexander romance, 14th century (Venice, San Lazzaro, 424).

This apotheosis was negatively affected by the Mongol and Mamluk conquests, which gave rise to a new wave of diaspora, notably towards Crimea. In Greater Armenia, miniature production declined after 1350 till the invasions of Timur in 1386-1387, 1394-1396 and 1399-1403. At the beginning of the 15th century, Northern Armenia (mainly Tatev) still produced a limited amount of illuminated manuscripts, in a "fairly new, fiery and lively" style, while the school of the Lake Van region produced miniatures with a "more classical, static and monotonous" design, before getting assimilated to the style of Tatev then totally fading away. The late pictorial tradition of Greater Armenia also developed in Khizan, where it incorporated Persian influences, and manifested itself in a "richer and nuanced" palette and "bright colors, dynamic and emotive compositions, elongated silhouettes". The school of Van, on the other hand, lead a renewal based on late Cilician models, in search of a more refined expression; linked to the Aghtamar catholicosate, this school gave rise to "richly colored with sustained tones, enhanced with gold compositions that occupy all available space", illustrated in particular by Minas, an Armenian miniaturist. These artistic elements stimulated "the lasting evolution of Armenian painting until the seventeenth century".

The end of the 15th and the first half of the 16th centuries saw all production stop, before being reborn timidly, especially again in Khizan, with Hakob of Julfa. The new 16th-century artists dedicated the revival of the miniatures for historiographical works, which was exceptional at the time, probably reflecting an intention to preserve national identity, with for example Karapet de Berkri (from the end of the 15th century), or the illuminators of two copies of the Alexander Romance; the abundant illustrations show more freedom, the Christological cycle is enriched, the style is mainly decorative but does not exclude a monumental expressiveness, and the colors are vivid. Patronage was also changing: a lot of the patrons were now traders or artisans, which reflects a certain secularization of Armenian manuscripts. The Armenian printing press made its debut in Venice (in 1511) and in Constantinople and finally in New Julfa (in 1630).

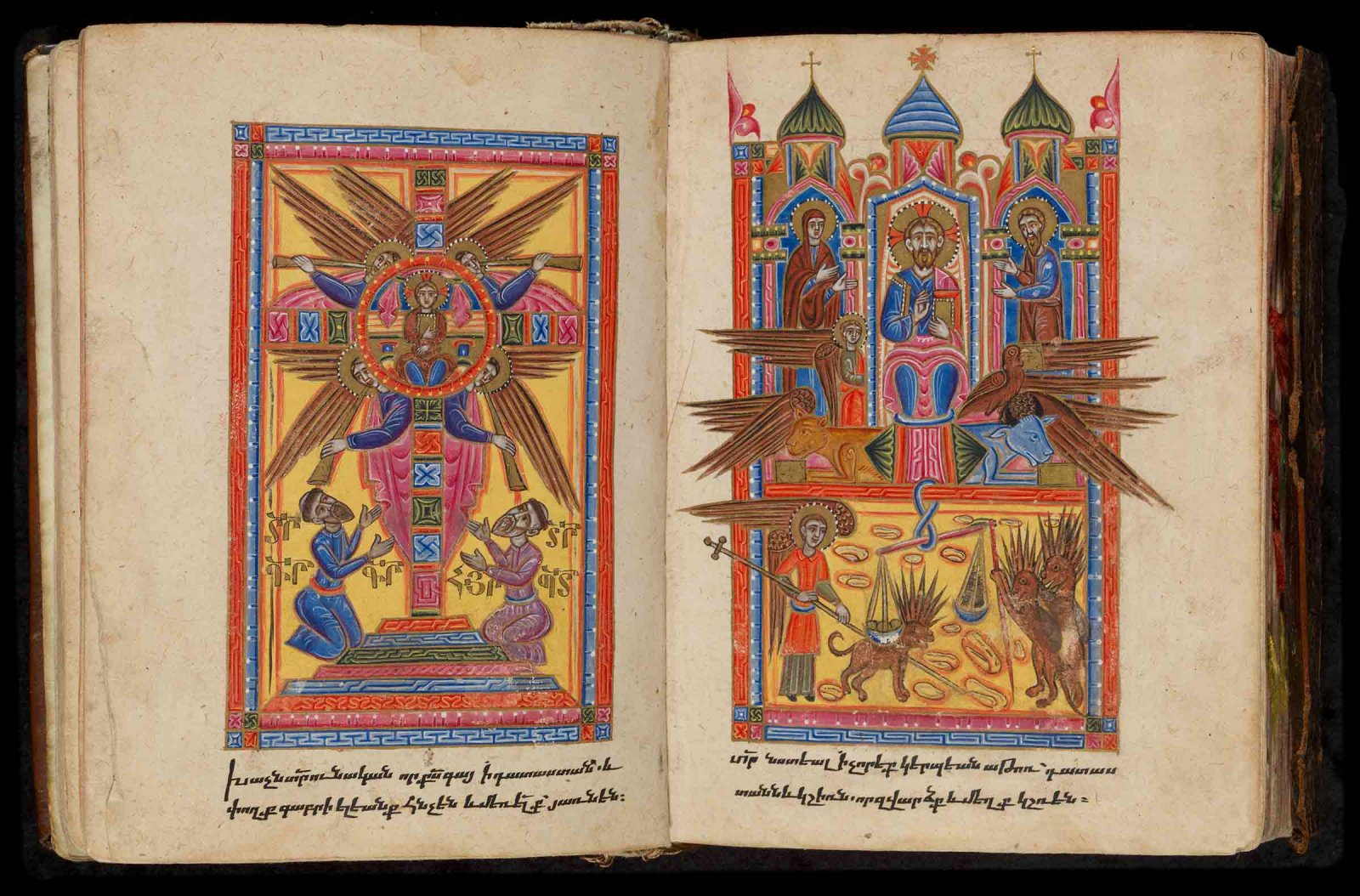
Pages from Armenian illuminated manuscripts produced in Isfahan, 17th century AD.

In the 17th century, the art of miniature was mainly expressed in the Armenian minorities of Crimea, Poland, Italy and Jerusalem, where it experienced the first tendency towards uniformity. The Cilician tradition continued in Constantinople, while moving closer to the Crimean models (especially with the color palette) and while innovating new iconographic themes from the Old Testament, as well as new pictorial techniques in perspectives due to the contact with western European books. The school of New Julfa witnessed the coexistence of Armenian, Persian, European and even Far Eastern styles. However, a wave of standardization in Constantinople soon gained the lead, as well as a Westernization inspired by European engravings, to finally produce the last Armenian illuminated manuscripts in the 18th century, such as a Book of Prayers by Gregory of Narek made in 1762 in Constantinople.

Replaced by the printing press, manuscripts were no longer produced out of necessity but out of pure piety and for their aesthetic quality. The Armenian tradition of miniature painting completely disappeared at the beginning of the 19th century, "but the history of art does not forget any of its pages of glory, and the miniature which reflects with joy the loftiness of the aesthetic ideal of the Middle Ages, continues to be part of the treasures of world culture".

== Legacy ==
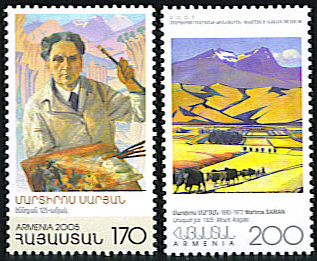
Martiros Saryan, self-portrait and Mount Aragats (1925), Armenian postage stamps.

While the art of the Armenian miniature declined little by little, a transition, little studied until now, took place between it and painting on canvas in the seventeenth century; artists exercised their talent both in miniature and in painting, such as the illuminator Minas and Ter Stepanos. This transition thus leads to modern Armenian painting.

Armenian painters, like other painters from different cultures, have never ceased to look into what the past masters of their national culture had accomplished. Indeed, in 1944, the Armenian painter Arshile Gorky, an abstract expressionist, wrote from the United States of America a letter to his sister and spoke to her of his passion for the painter and illuminator Toros Roslin. He notes: “Toros Roslin is the Renaissance. What electricity does man contain! To me he is the greatest artist the world has produced before modern times, and his use of dimension is surpassed only by Cubism. Masterful, unsurpassed dimensionality. I bow to our Toros”.

"The dimension of a drawing", of a painting or of a portrait "is the relationship between the object drawn and the object taken in kind". For Gorky, Toros Roslin already possessed precision, depth and perspective in his miniatures, hence his expression of “masterful dimensionality”.

As for the Armenian painter Minas Avetisyan, his own contemplation on illuminators comes above all from the Vaspurakan school with its stylistic particularities. Indeed, in certain miniatures, the composition and treatment of the scenes are subject to a linear layout without figuration of depth. "The line then becomes the main means of expression and it acquires liveliness thanks to the use of pure and vibrant colors", according to iconographers Akopian and Korkhmazian. The use of scarlet red in opposition to ultramarine blue and sienna, as decorative elements (therefore without depth), and the use of pure and vibrant colors with powerful chromatic chords is reminiscent of the miniatures of Greater Armenia. This use of vibrant colors in their purity has a purpose. Its purpose of touching directly on emotion, used by Roslin whilst following the aesthetic ideal of the Middle Ages, but exacerbated and ardent with the works of Soviet Armenian painter Martiros Saryan, vehement and thrilling, and even tragic in all its subject matter with the works of Minas Avetissian. Thus, the Armenian painters of the modern period seem closer to the illuminators of the Middle Ages than to many painters from other periods of the history of Armenian art. Long before Caravaggio and his technical development of chiaroscuro: “Toros is the Renaissance”, concludes Arshile Gorky.

=== Armenian filmography ===
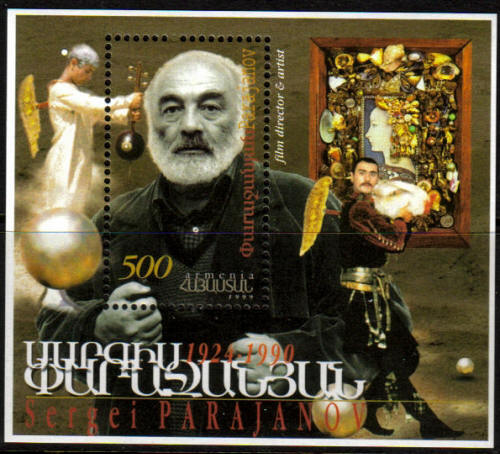
Sergei Parajanov, postage stamp issued by the Armenian Post.

Miniature art has also influenced Armenian cinema. Sergei Parajanov, the author of Sayat-Nova, (later renamed The Color of Pomegranates) an allegorical film about the life of the Armenian poet Sayat-Nova, had reflected a great deal on the art of miniature, in the medieval era and its relationship to space and time in their representation. Indeed, in the Middle Ages, the construction of space according to the rules of perspective was still ignored. The hierarchy of figures and elements is suggested by the size, the rhythmic alternation of colours, the symbolic code of gestures, and that of hieratic postures, like the more lively scenes of popular life. The composition of the space into places corresponds to a specifically medieval conception. Moreover, time is expressed by space: by the juxtaposition of different places which constitute so many different moments of a story, and thus brought together to produce meaning. The richness of the image is the most striking feature. “By drawing on Armenian poetry and culture without fear of crossing Persian influences, one of the cradles of alchemy, the filmmaker encounters the hermetic tradition. She finds herself indissolubly attached to the images and motifs with which he arranges his shots. Hence the enigmatic tone of the paintings, close to the impeded fantasy of which Roger Caillois speaks in connection with alchemical allegories”. The entire film is an expression of the material imagination, that is to say, “the art of staying as close as possible to the elements, materials, textures, colors”.

In an article in the newspaper Libération, in 1982, Serge Daney, a film critic, takes up the words of the filmmaker: "it seemed to me that a static image, in the cinema, can have a depth like a miniature, a plasticity and an internal dynamic,” noted Paradjanov. The author of Sayat-Nova contemplated a lot on the Armenian miniature, he declared: "I thought that the cinema could be static by the image, as can be a Persian or Indian miniature, and have a plastic and inner dynamics. This is why Sayat-Nova was different from my previous films, when I reflected and worked on Armenian religious miniatures, full of spirituality and poetry. They awakened in me an astonishing feeling of veneration”.

== Armenian prayer roll ==
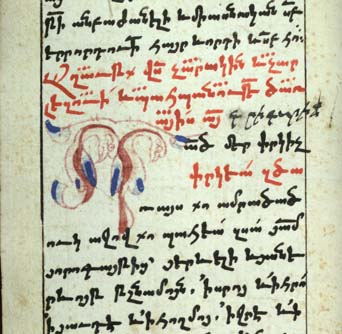
Armenian Prayers roll from the year 1661 AD.

Another form of an illuminated manuscript is a prayer roll, which traditionally included images from the Armenian iconography as well as Biblical passages or teachings but at a much smaller size was a more personal, and portable, religious treasure. Armenian prayer rolls could include iconography applicable to all Christian sects, such as images of St. Mark, St. Luke, or St. John as well as panels depicting important moments in the life of Jesus Christ. For the Armenians, however, the rolls would also include illustrations specific to the history of their country or church. These included St. Gregory the Illuminator credited with bringing Christianity to Armenian in the 4th century and St. Nerses IV important to the growth of Christianity in Armenia in the 12th century as well as establishing the theology of icon veneration within the Armenian Church. As in the case of other traditional Armenian manuscripts, prayer rolls were drawn and illustrated by hand on vellum. The scroll served as a personal talisman for the protection of its owner or for the needs and prayer intentions of members of their family. Prayer rolls were narrow in width and included panels of religious illustrations followed by religious text. The rolls were always quite long although exact measurements varied, depending on the number of panels it contained. The owner of this religious artifact could tightly roll the vellum and conceal it when carried. Concealment was crucial for the protection of the prayer roll since illuminated manuscripts and prayer rolls were highly valued and targeted by thieves. Devout Armenians held manuscripts and other works of art of the Church in high regard due to the fact the church and its teachings were an important part of daily life in medieval Armenia; the church fulfilled all spiritual, social, moral and cultural needs.

== Techniques and scripts ==
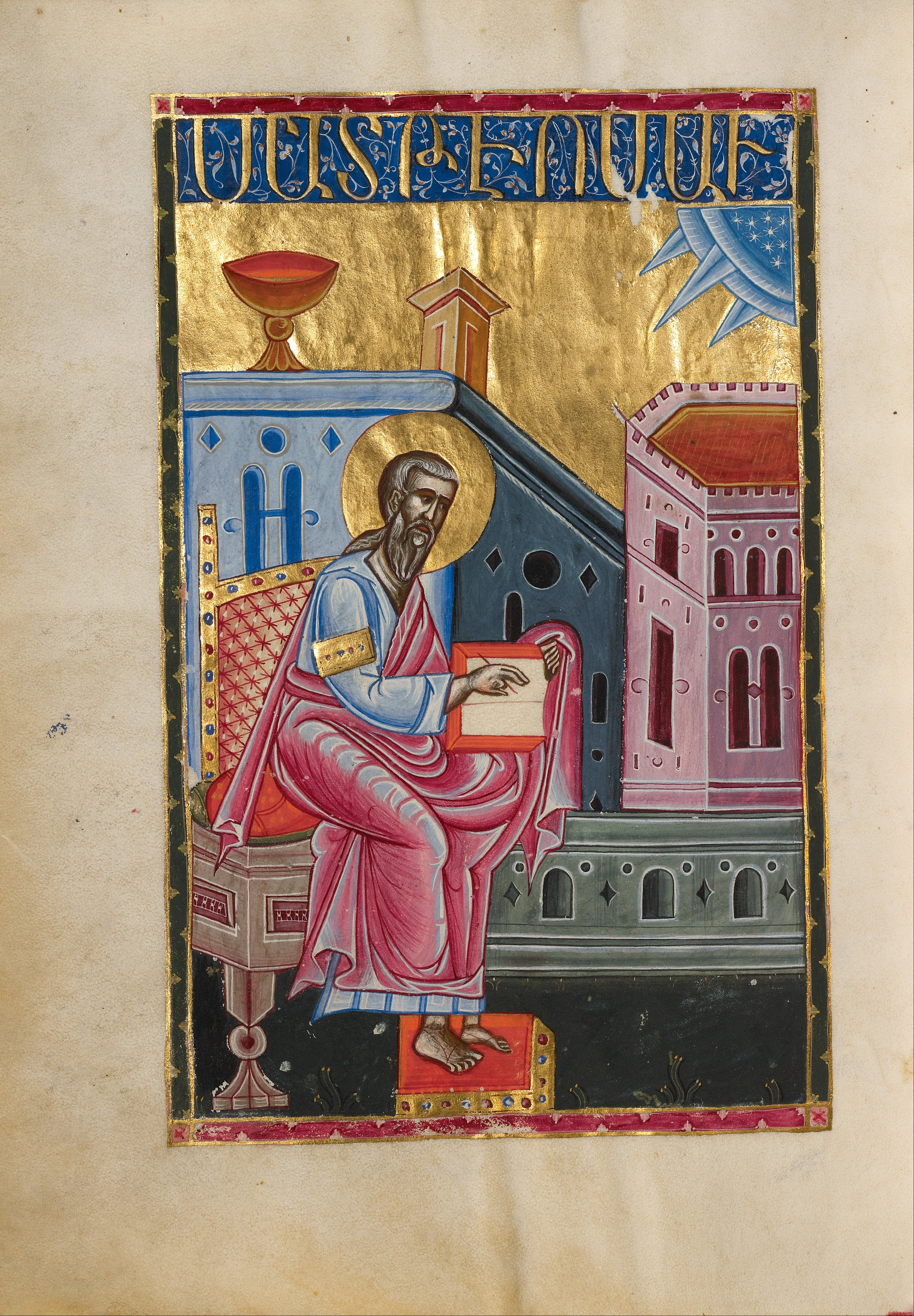
Page illuminated by Malnazar, 17th century.

About 31,000 manuscripts still survive after continuous invasions of Armenia throughout the centuries and the more recent Armenian Diaspora where hundreds of thousands of Armenians were displaced or massacred. Illuminated manuscripts mostly recount religious teachings and gospels of the Armenians and were handed down through families. So valuable were these manuscripts it was regarded as a sacrilege to sell or damage them, or to allow the manuscripts to fall into enemy hands. Most of the manuscripts were written and illustrated by monks located in monasteries. Many manuscripts are very elaborate, covered in gilt and brilliant colors. However, there is another type of manuscript which was stripped of unnecessary ornamentation, lacking colored backgrounds and painted with transparent colors, often with less-than-perfect artistry.

Manuscripts were adorned with fantastical creatures and birds, which often formed the initial letters of chapters to attract the eye while providing a mental break during which the beauty of the illustration could refresh the mind and spirit. These brilliantly illustrated letters were followed by "erkat’agir", an uncial script also known as iron script, as it originally was carved into stone. Notary script known as "notrgir" was used for writing the script and colophon and "bolorgir", meaning "rounded letters" was often used as a minuscule in writing the rubrics, which are sections written in red ink in order to draw attention. Black lettering was used to write the chapters, symbolizing the pain of original sin, while the white paper space symbolized the innocence of birth. The colophon, also written in red ink, was usually found at the beginning or end of the manuscript and would provide information about the scribe, the patron, the artist, the date, when, where, and for whom the manuscript was created. Often the scribe would add notes about his working conditions or anecdotes of wisdom in the colophon and often carried into the margins of the manuscript. So important was owning a manuscript, the owner would add his name to the script. If a manuscript had multiple owners, multiple signatures might be found within the script.

The painting support used by the artists of Armenian miniatures was the same as the material used for the pages of the manuscripts: parchment, until the 12th century, or paper; the latter, already present in the 10th century, was then used the most (56% of manuscripts in the 12th century, 66% in the 14th century, 80% in the 15th century) and ended up eclipsing parchment. This support was assembled and folded in codices; the 8-folio format was standard, although the 12-folio became widespread in Cilicia in the 13th century.

The illuminator used to paint after the scribe finished writing the manuscript (except with the Eusebian canons); the artists most often started with “the non-figurative decoration, frontispieces, ornamental letters, marginal decorations, to end with the miniatures”.

The pigments used by Armenian illuminators are mainly preparations of metallic oxides, which contribute to the brilliance of their works: cobalt for the blues, iron for the brownish red, copper for the greens, and antimony for the yellow. As for the gold, it was used in the form of thin sheets cut and pasted on the sheet of the manuscript, or reduced to powder then transformed into the paint. Organic pigments were also used, such as cochineal carmine, or gamboge for the yellows, produced from the resin of species of the Clusiaceae family. Finally, the calcined bones were used to produce different substances used for white or for black. The binders used were most commonly gum arabic and oil.

== Gallery ==
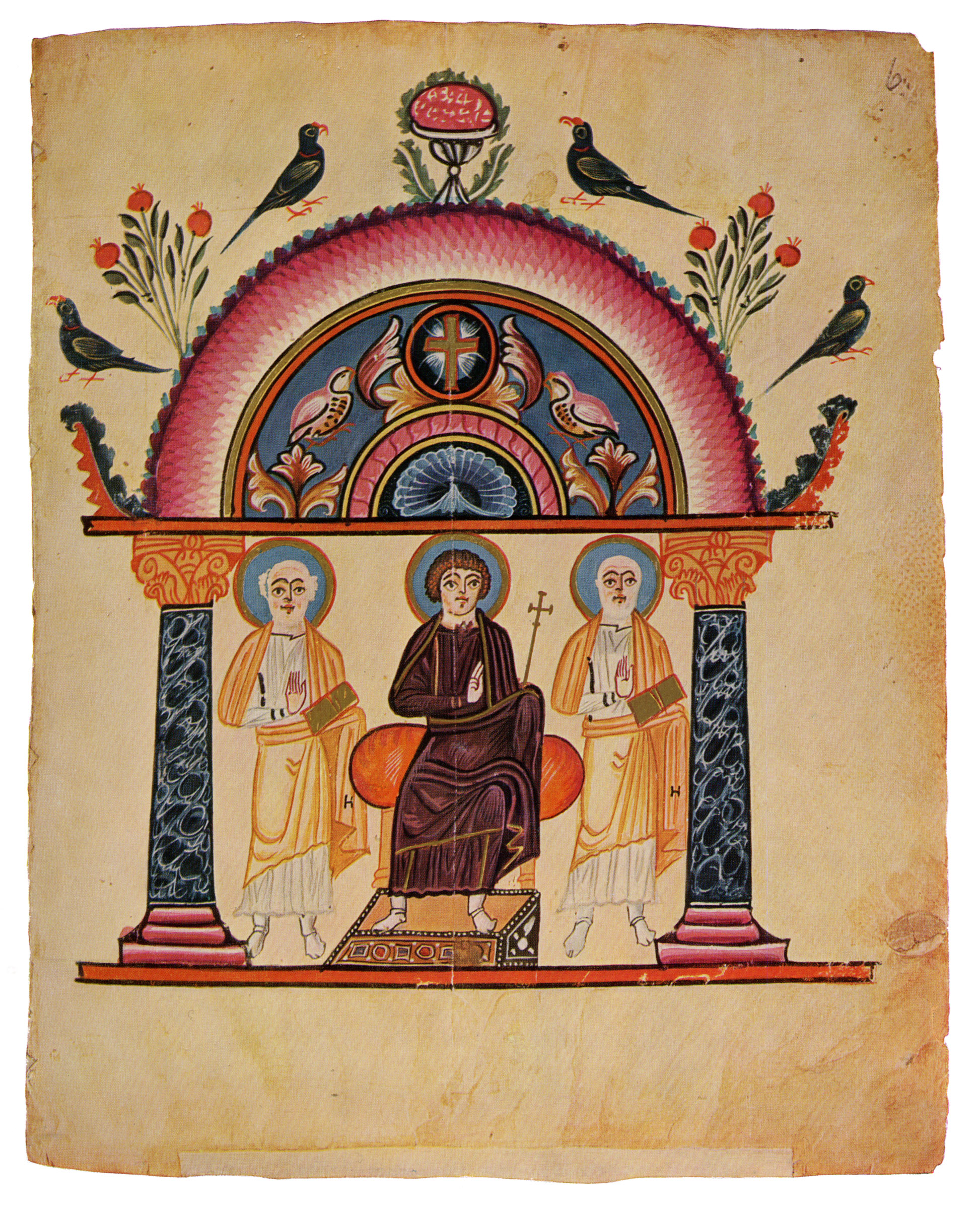
Etchmiadzin gospel, 989

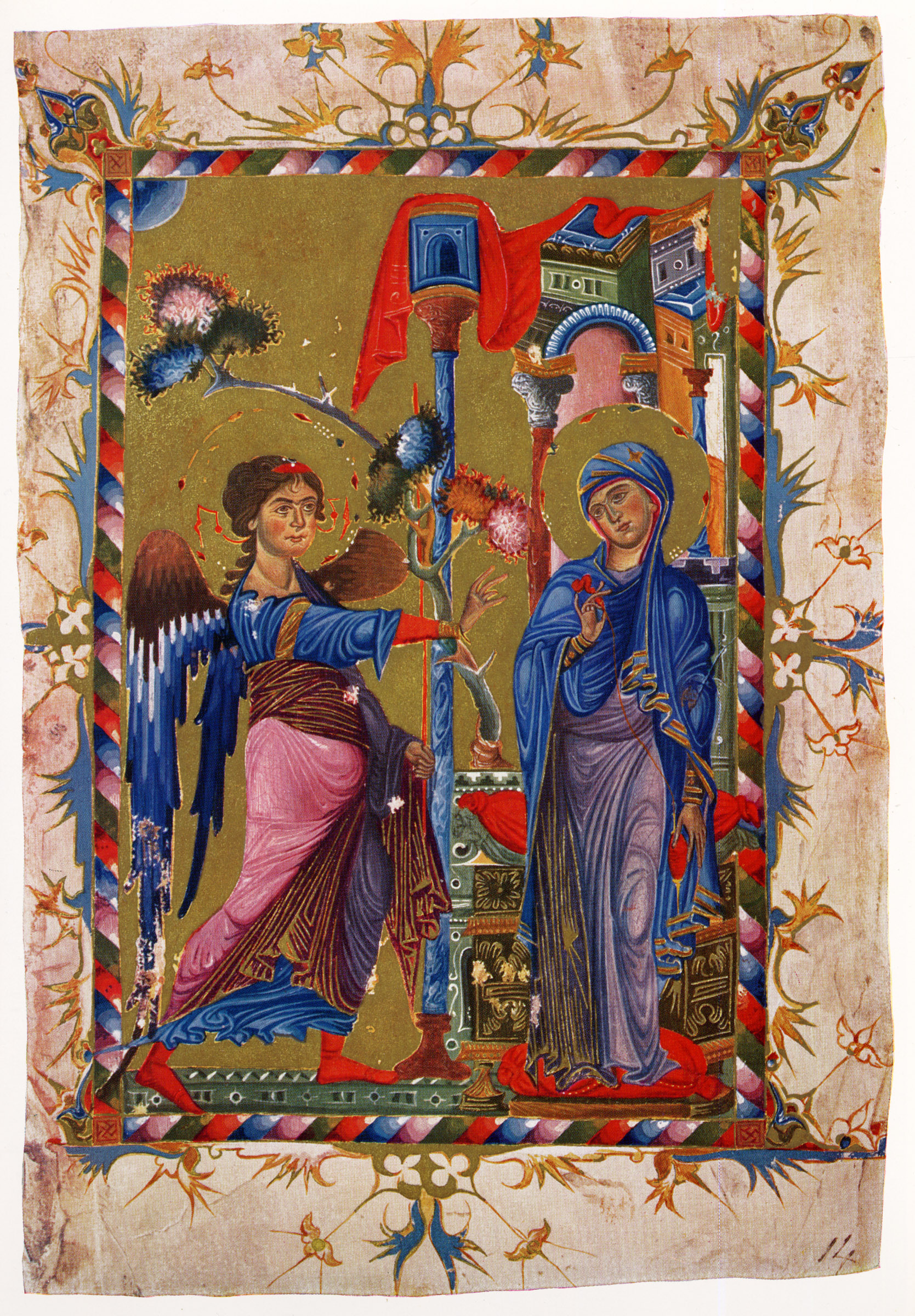
Gospel by Toros Roslin, 13th century

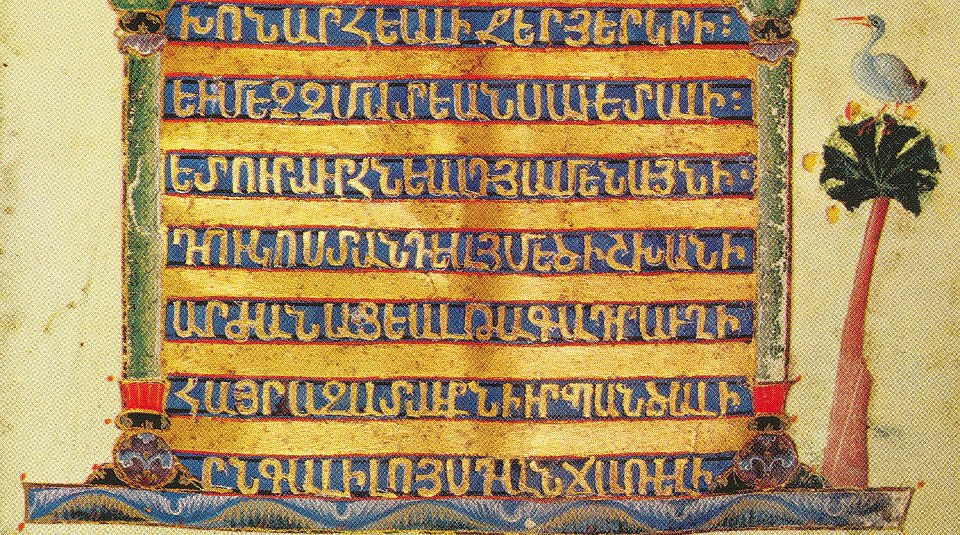
Manuscript, 13th century

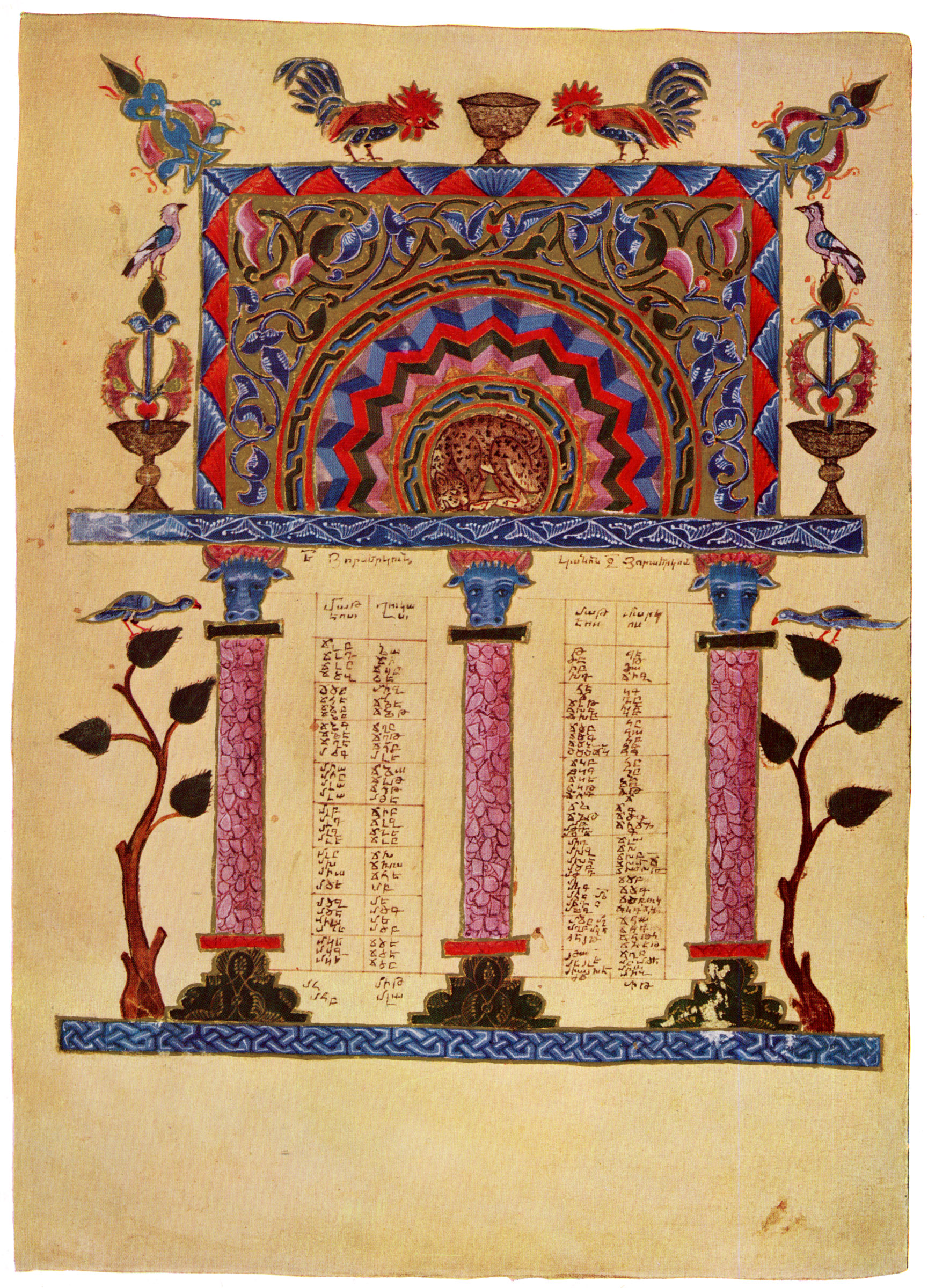
Manuscript, 13th century

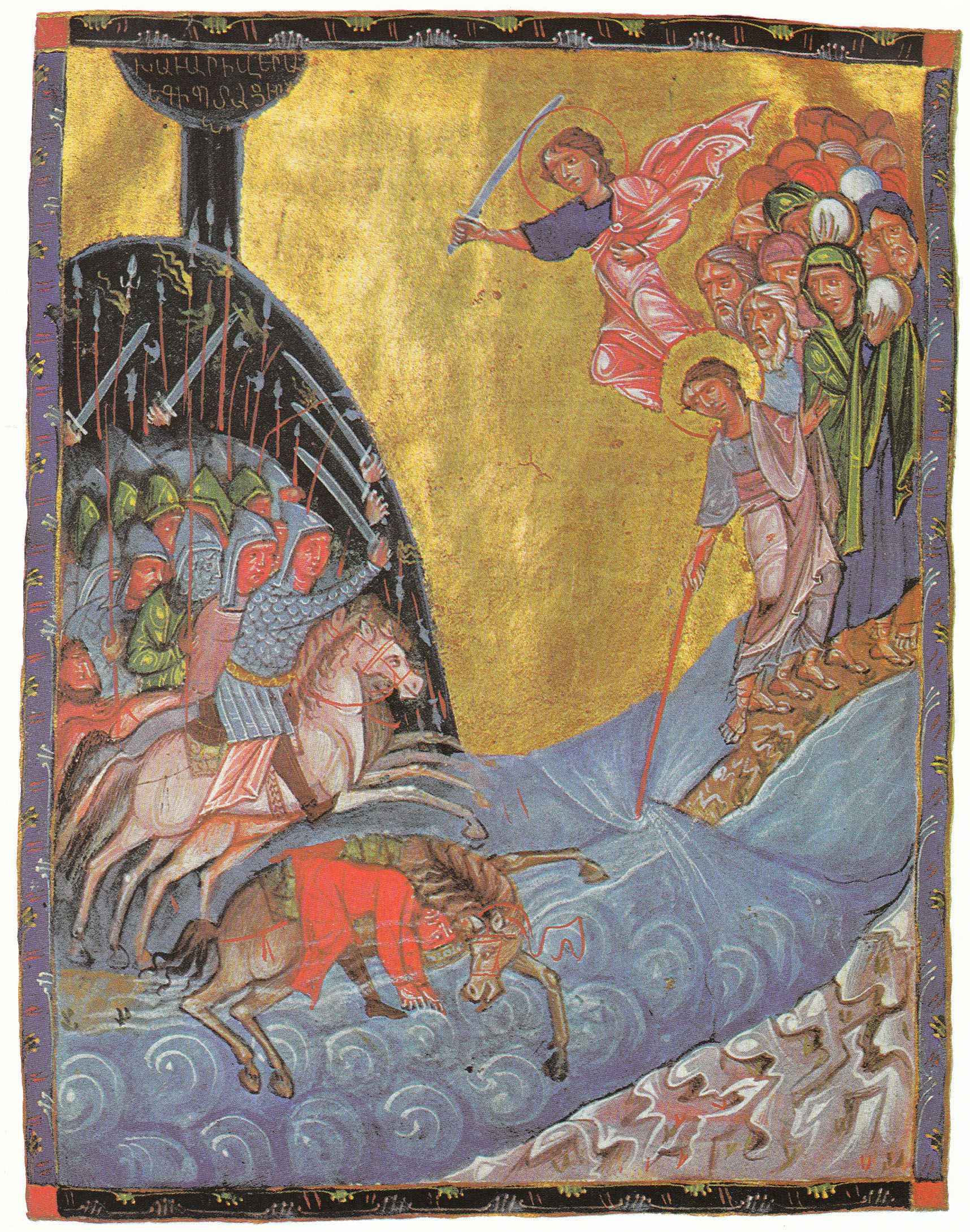
Manuscript by Toros Roslin, 1266

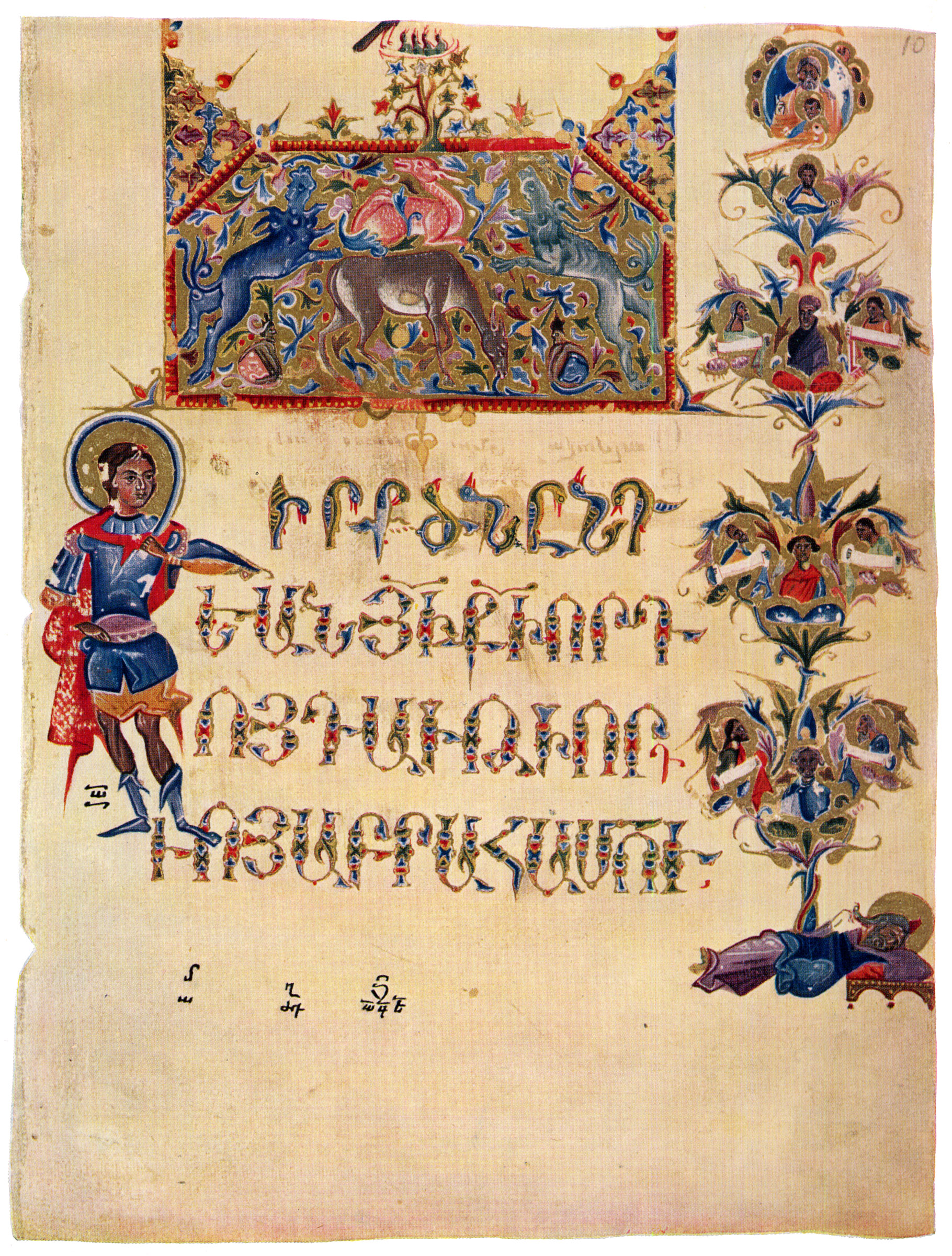

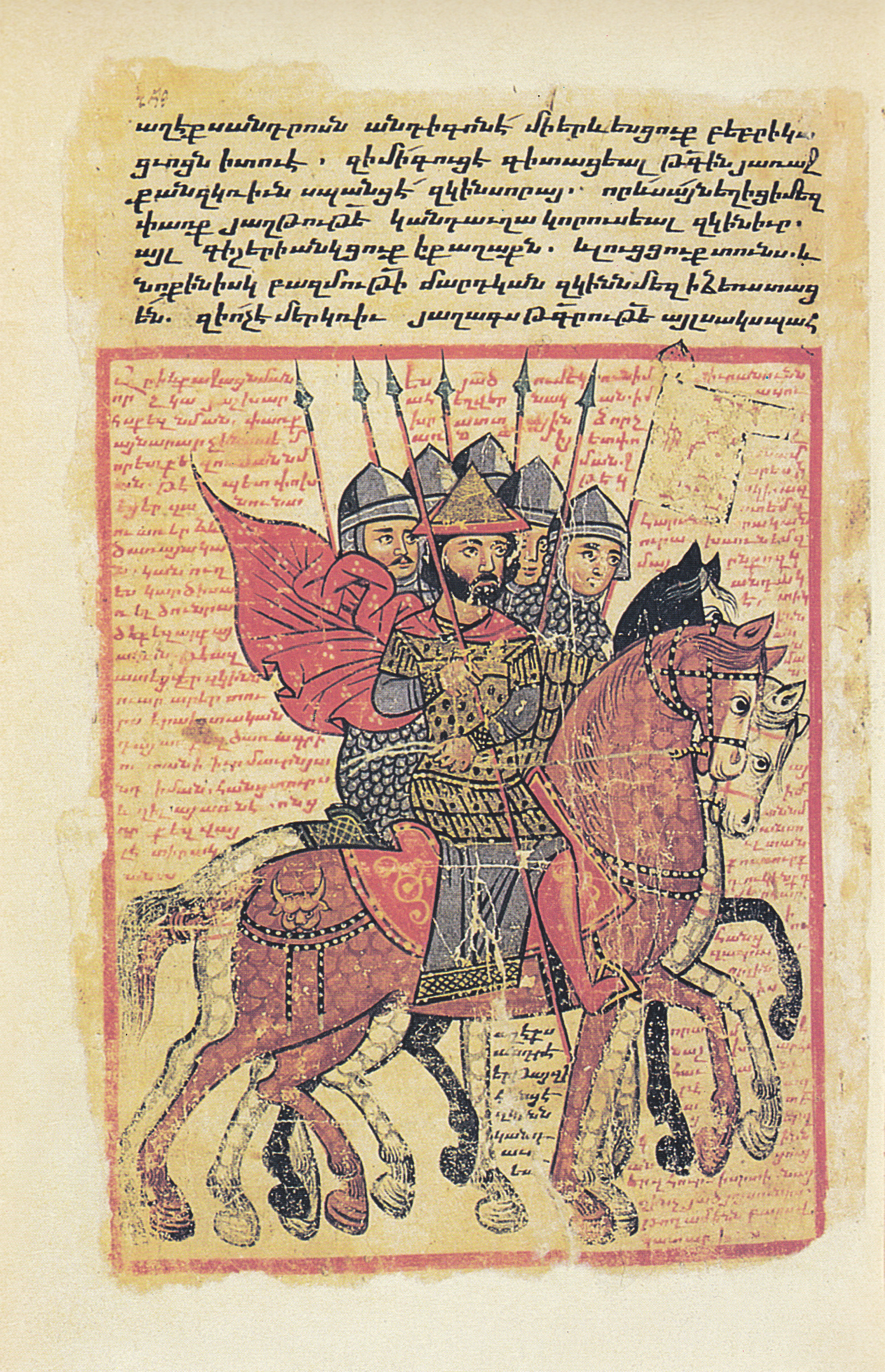
Manuscript, 14 century

Manuscript, 1378

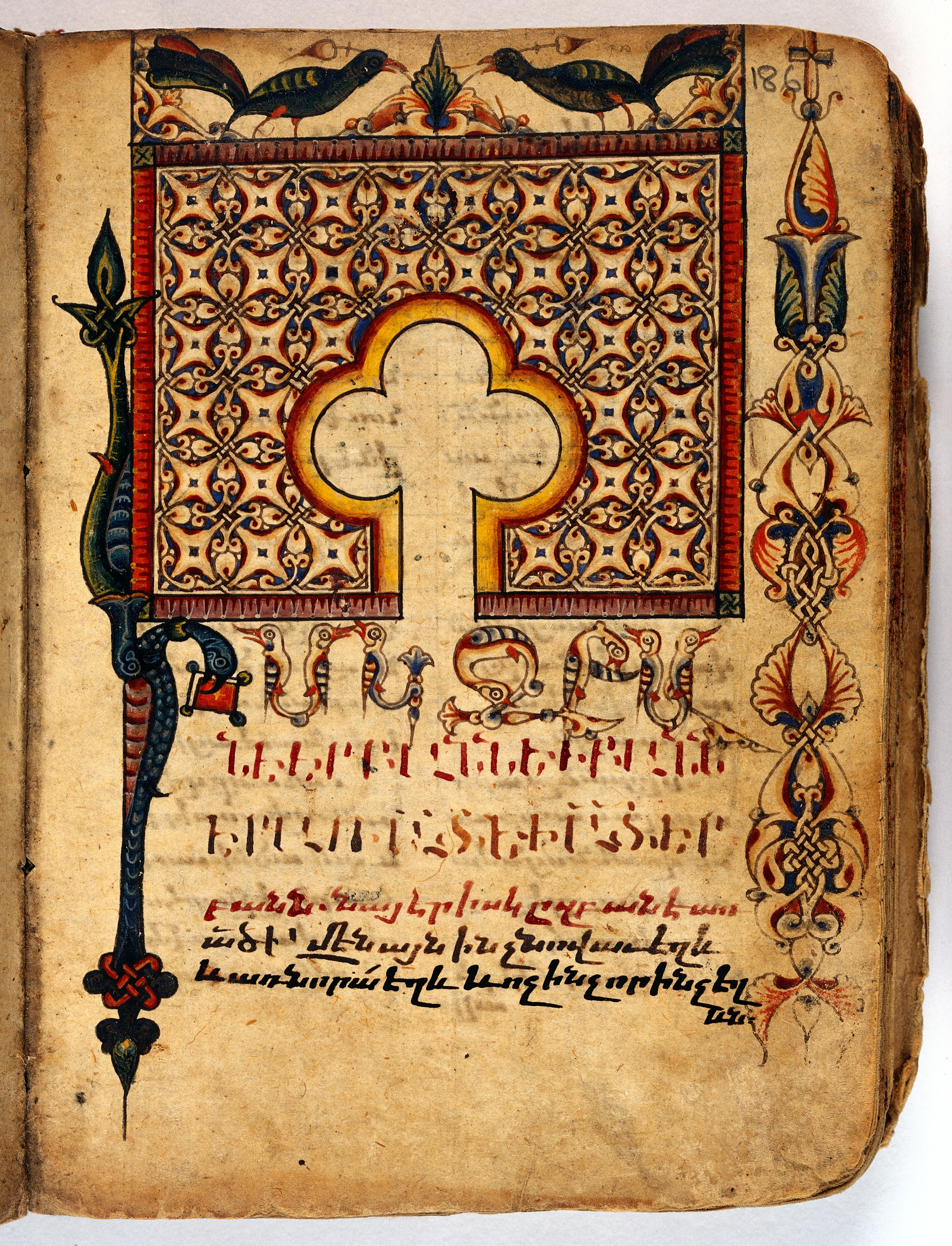
The Four Gospels, 1495, The headpiece (Khoran) of St John's Gospel, Wellcome Collection. Manuscript, 1495

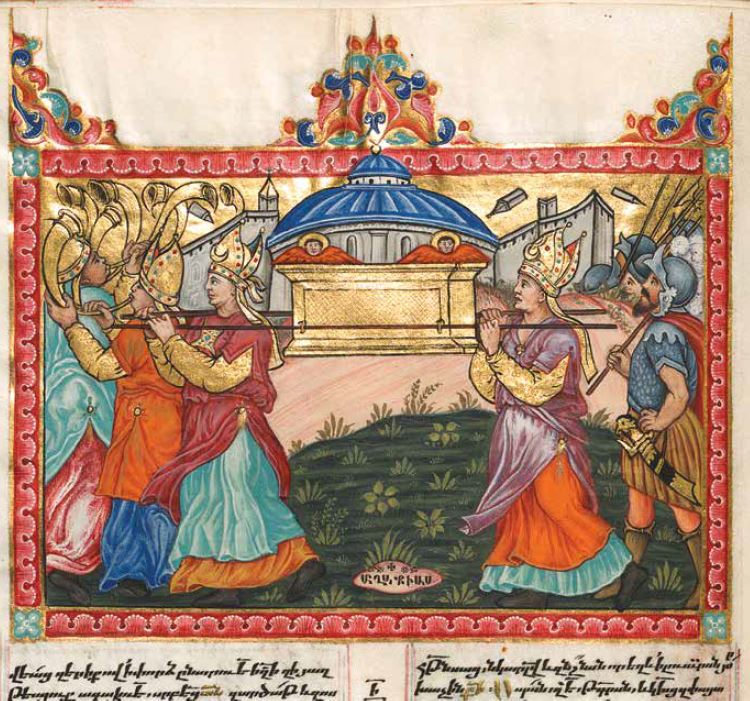
Manuscript, 1686

== See also ==
- Armenian art
- Armenian literature
- Armenian Apostolic Church
- Culture of Armenia
- Byzantine illuminated manuscripts
- Arabic miniature
- Persian miniature
- History of Armenia
