= Mugni Gospels =

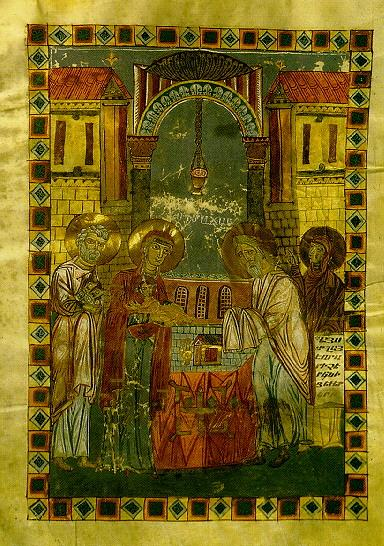
Presentation of Jesus at the Temple.

The Mugni Gospel (Yerevan, Matenadaran, MS 7736) is an 11th-century Armenian Gospel Book produced in 1060. The manuscript is 42 by 32 cm and contains 301 folios. The binding of the book is made of wood, covered with red velvet and ornamented with plaques of silver and gilt. The first lines of each gospel are in gold. The first letters are lavishly decorated and painted. Actually, the book seems to be overloaded with miniatures and decorations. Saturated colours, expressive figures and fanciful architectural backdrops distinguish it from a more stylized and decorative Byzantine manner of manuscript illumination.

== See also ==
- Armenian illuminated manuscript
