= Lydia Durnovo =

- Born: 13 May [O.S. 1 May] 1885; Smolensk, Russian Empire
- Died: January 7, 1963 (aged 82); Yerevan, Armenian SSR, Soviet Union
- Other name: Lydia Durnova (used until 1952 as a pseudonym to cover up her aristocratic roots)
- Occupation: Art history
- Awards: Honored Art Worker of the Armenian SSR (1945)

Lydia Aleksandrovna Durnovo (Russian: Лидия Александровна Дурново; 1885 – 1963) was a Soviet art historian and art restorer. She specialized in medieval art, especially in early Russian painting and Armenian illuminated manuscripts (miniatures) and frescoes.

Born in the Russian city of Smolensk, Durnovo first attended a local gymnasium and a painting school before moving to Saint Petersburg where she attended the School of Technical Drawing of Baron Alexander von Stieglitz beginning in 1903. She subsequently completed her postgraduate studies at the State Institute of Art History (Государственный институт истории искусств) and the Archaeology Institute (ru) between 1920 and 1923. Durnovo worked as a research fellow at the Archaeology Institute, specializing in early Russian art. She was also the assistant curator of the Russian Museum.

In October 1933 she was arrested for allegedly being an "active member of a counterrevolutionary fascist organization." She was deported to Siberia and eventually freed three years later, in November 1936. Durnovo moved to the Armenian capital of Yerevan and became a member of the staff of the National Gallery of Armenia. Until 1951 she was devoted to the study of medieval Armenian frescoes and illuminated manuscripts. She specialized in medieval Armenian art, and by the mid-1950s Durnovo earned the reputation of an authoritative expert in the field. She supervised the restoration of the Etchmiadzin Cathedral's frescoes. She was rehabilitated by the Soviet government in 1956.

== Publications ==
- Собрание копий памятников древнерусской монументальной живописи Государственного института истории искусств. Л., 1925.
- Техника древнерусской живописи. Русский музей. Художественный отдел. Материалы по технике и методам реставрации древнерусской живописи. Л., 1926.
- Техника древнерусской фрески. Секция пространственных мастеров и научно-показательная часть. Техника стенописи. Гос. академия художественных наук. М., 1927.
- Икона Спаса Нерукотворного (№ 3045. Гос. русский музей). Сб. «Материалы по русскому искусству», т. I. Л., 1928.
- Древнеармянская миниатюра [Old Armenian miniature] (in Russian). Yerevan: Armenian SSR State Publishing. 1952.
  - Miniatures arméniennes (in French). Paris: Les Éditions Cercle d'art. 1960. OCLC 419609788.
  - Armenian miniatures. New York: H.N. Abrams. 1961. OCLC 741860570.
- Краткая история древнеармянской живописи [Brief History of Ancient Armenian Painting] (in Russian). Yerevan: Armenian SSR State Publishing. 1957.
