= Echmiadzin Gospels =

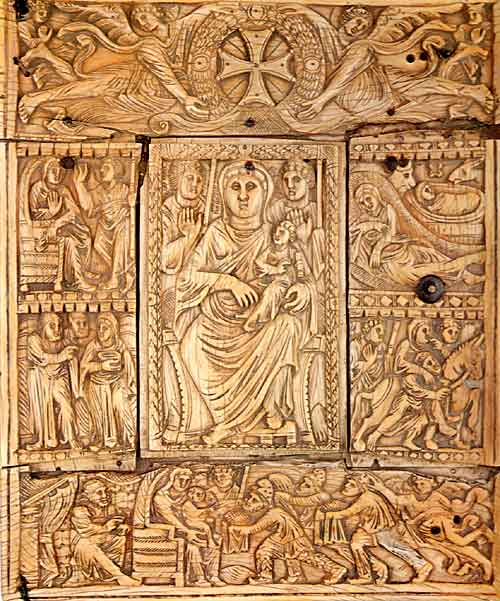
Carved ivory binding, front cover in five sections of Echmiadzin Gospel, Virgin and Child with scenes from her life, 6th century

The Echmiadzin Gospels (Armenian: Էջմիածնի Ավետարան, romanized: Ecmiadzni Avetaran) (Yerevan, Matenadaran, MS. 2374, formerly Etchmiadzin Ms. 229) is a 10th-century Armenian Gospel Book produced in 989 at the Monastery of Bgheno-Noravank in Syunik. Up to the 10th century, eight dated Armenian Gospel manuscripts have survived: the Gospels of Queen Mlké (851-862) (Venice № 1144/86), the Lazarian Gospels (887) (Matenadaran № 6200), The Gospels of Ashot Sparapet (909) (Matenadaran № 6202), Dsurghut Gospels (974) (Georgia), the Sanasarian Gospels (985) (Matenadaran № 7735), Sk'antchelagorts Gospels (988) (Matenadaran № 8906), Ejmiadsin Gospels (989) (Matenadaran № 2374) and the Gospels of the Translators (966-996) (Walters Art Gallery).

== The book ==
The manuscript has 232 extant leaves which measure approximately 32 by 25.5 cm. The book was made under the patronage of Bishop Stepanos and written by the scribe Hovhanes. The binding of the book is made of two carved ivory plaques, probably of Byzantine manufacture of the 6th century. Bound into the book are two leaves (fols. 228–229) with miniatures dating to the late 6th—early 7th century (so-called 'Final Four Miniatures').

== Eusebian Canons ==
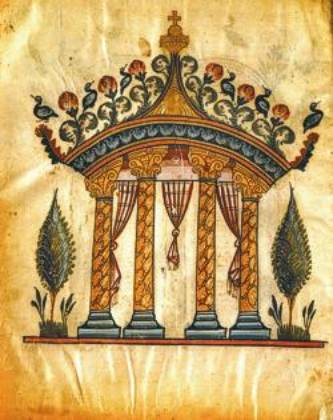
An illumination from the manuscript.

The art historian Carl Nordenfalk considered the Eusebian canon tables in the Echmiadzin Gospels (fols. 1–5, including the Eusebian letter) to be the best representative of the original table design (column arrangement, pattern of frame, ornament, etc.) developed in Caesarea Palaestina at the time of Eusebius (1st half of the 4th century). Taking into account the Caesarean type of the Armenian text of the Gospels, Nordenfalk concluded that the Echmiadzin Gospels were copied from a Caesarean codex equipped with the Eusebian canon tables.
