= The Gospels of the Translators =

966 Armenian illuminated manuscript

The Gospels of the Translators or The Four Gospels is one of oldest Armenian illuminated manuscripts dated 966 or 996 and is kept in the Walters Art Museum in Baltimore. Up to the 10th century eight dated Armenian manuscripts have survived: the Gospels of Queen Mlké (851-862) (Venice № 1144/86), the Lazarian Gospels (887) (Matenadaran № 6200), The Gospels of Ashot Sparapet (909) (Matenadaran № 6202), Dsurghut Gospels (974) (Georgia), the Sanasarian Gospels (985) (Matenadaran № 7735), Sk'antchelagorts Gospels (988) (Matenadaran № 8906), Ejmiadsin Gospels (989) (Matenadaran № 2374) and the Gospels of the Translators (966-996) (Walters Art Gallery).
