= Gospels of Queen Mlké =

9th-century Armenian illuminated manuscript

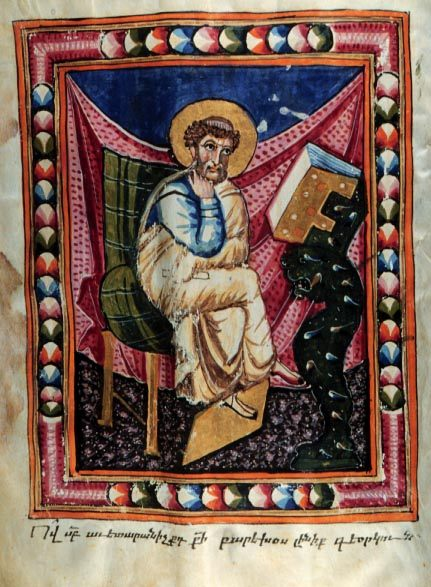
Saint Matthew portrait from the Gospel of Queen Mlke.

The Gospels of Queen Mlké (Armenian: Մլքե թագուհու Ավետարան) is one of oldest Armenian illuminated manuscripts dated 851 or 862 and is kept in the Mekhitarist abbey on San Lazzaro degli Armeni. It is named after the wife of King Gagik I of Vaspurakan, who had it restored in the 10th century and is composed of 464 lambskin pages. Up to the 10th century eight dated Armenian manuscripts have survived: the Gospels of Queen Mlké (851-862) (Venice № 1144/86), the Lazarian Gospels (887) (Matenadaran № 6200), The Gospels of Ashot Sparapet (909) (Matenadaran № 6202), Dsurghut Gospels (974) (Georgia), the Sanasarian Gospels (985) (Matenadaran № 7735), Sk'antchelagorts Gospels (988) (Matenadaran № 8906), Ejmiadsin Gospels (989) (Matenadaran № 2374) and the Gospels of the Translators (966-996) (Walters Art Gallery).
