= Bgheno-Noravank =

11th-century Armenian monastery

- Բղենո-Նորավանք
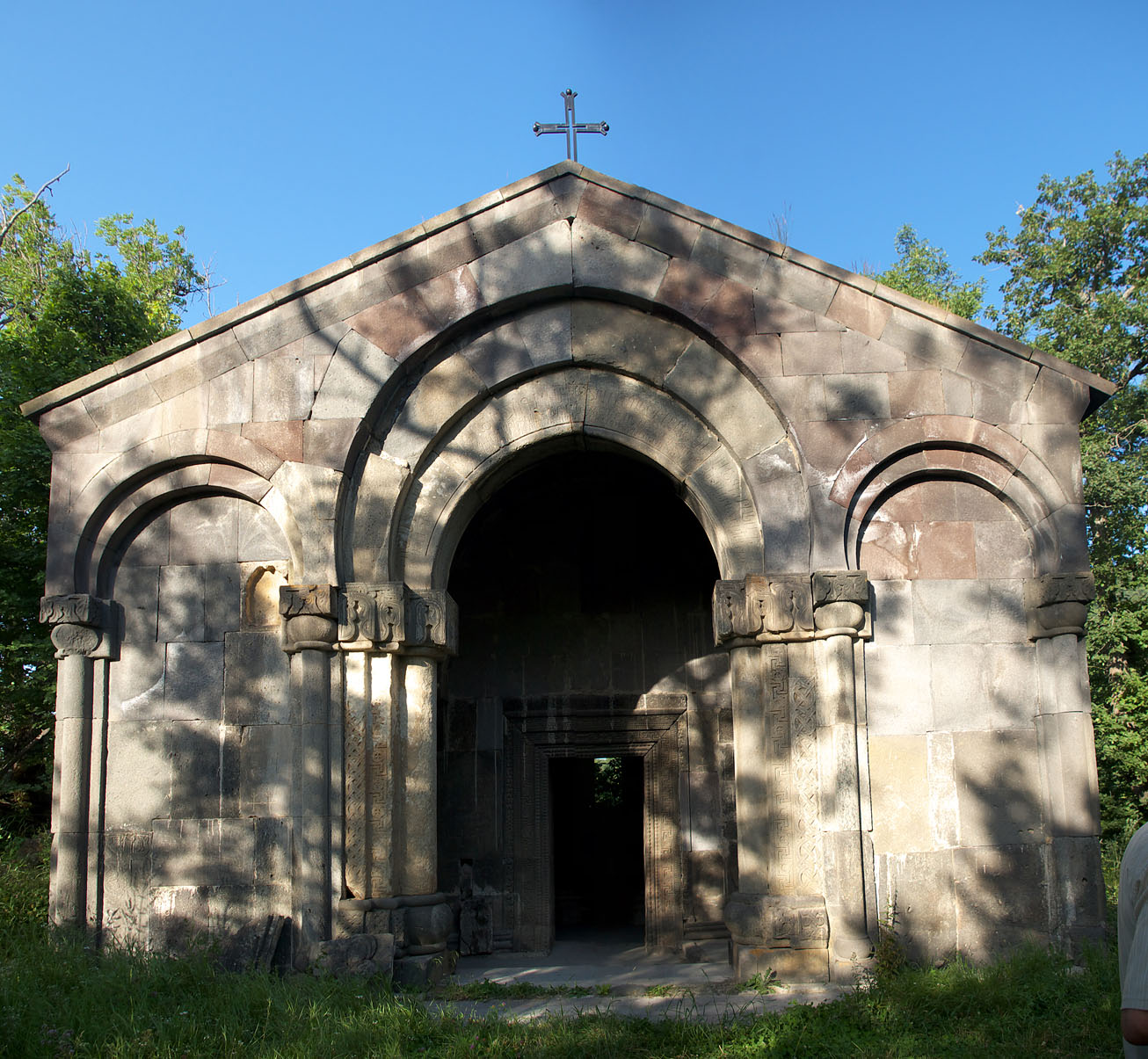

- Location within Armenia Location within Syunik Province

Religion
- Affiliation: Armenian Apostolic Church

Location
- Location: About 6 km southeast of Shinuhayr, Syunik Province, Armenia
- Coordinates: 39.388155°N 46.360081°E

Architecture
- Style: Armenian
- Completed: 1062

Bgheno-Noravank (Armenian: Բղենո-Նորավանք) is an 11th-century Armenian monastery in the province of Syunik in Armenia, 3 km to the East of Bardzravan village, to the left of the road to Shurnukh, on a triangular promontory surrounded by wooded gorges. It now consists of a small church dating to 1062, located on a little wooded promontory, and ornately decorated with borders and biblical reliefs. The ruins of this church were rediscovered in the 1920s by Axel Bakunts, a well-known prose writer, during one of his wanderings as an agronomist.
