= Garbis Aprikian =

Armenian composer (1926–2024)

- Aprikian in the 1990s
- Born: 1926; Alexandria, Egypt
- Died: 15 October 2024 (aged 97–98); Malakoff, Hauts-de-Seine, France
- Occupations: Composer; Choral conductor
- Organizations: Sipan-Komitas
- Works: List of compositions
- Awards: Ordre des Arts et des Lettres · Grand Vermeil Medal

Garbis Aprikian (1926 – 15 October 2024) was a musician from the Armenian diaspora who was born in Egypt and moved to Paris in 1953, where he studied, inspired especially by Olivier Messiaen. He conducted the Armenian mixed chorus Sipan-Komitas for around 50 years, composing many works especially for the group and also arranging Armenian folk music and works of others. He combined melodies from Armenia with Western musical techniques such as harmonies and counterpoint. Aprikian is regarded as a pioneer of bringing Armenian music to France.

== Biography ==
Aprikian was born in Alexandria, Egypt, in 1926. He studied at the Armenian National Boghossian primary school and then at the American College. From the age of ten he began serious music lessons with Maestro Frapicini, a student of Pietro Mascagni, in piano as well as in harmony and counterpoint. He sang in the children's choir of the Eglise Arménienne d'Alexandrie, also as a soloist. Learning about Armenian history and music made him feel "a sense of national pride".

In 1948, Aprikian founded the mixed chorus Hamazkaine with which he gave concerts in Alexandria, in Cairo and on radio. The success encouraged members of the association Houssaper to award him a scholarship to complete his training in Europe.

=== Paris ===
Aprikian arrived in Paris in 1953 where he studied composition and conducting at the Ecole Normale of Music with Simone Plé-Caussade, Tony Aubin and Jean Fournet and took a course on musical aesthetics by Olivier Messiaen at the Conservatoire de Paris.

The Armenian mixed chorus Sipan-Komitas then sought him to replace Kurken Alemshah, and he accepted the position. He conducted the choir from the 1950s for about fifty years. He composed and harmonized popular melodies and old patriotic songs, more than two hundred religious, secular and folk works. They performed at the Festival d'Avignon, at Sénanque Abbey, the Chartreuse of Villeneuve-lès-Avignon, in Normandy, Rennes, Cannes, Venice, and the festival Art Sacré de la ville de Paris. They performed concerts in Brussels, Geneva, Bern, Basel, Munich and Amsterdam, among others, and recorded several CDs.

In 1991 Aprikian was invited for the first time by Armenian authorities to go to Yerevan, where he performed in a concert of his own works and those of other composers of the Armenian Diaspora.

=== Personal life ===
Agprikian had a son, Ara.

Aprikian died at his home in Malakoff, Hauts-de-Seine, on 15 October 2024, at the age of 98.

== Works ==
Aprikian said in an interview that in his compositions, he took melody mostly from Armenian music, but fused it with Western classical music's harmonies when he arranged themes from Armenian folk music, calling it a "'noble' transcription of tradition". He composed original works but also arrangements of Armenian folk music and of works by other Armenian composers such as Komitas. His sources included Armenian children's songs, prayers, songs about nature, battle songs and processional songs.

He composed the Petit suite nuptiale for his son's wedding, based on songs his father had sung to him when he was a child. He wrote an oratorio, Naissance de David de Sassoun, to a libretto by Hagop Oshagan, for soloists, choir and orchestra, premiered in 1994.

== Honours ==
- 1989 Medal of Saint Nerces Chenorali by Vasken I, Catholicos of all Armenians
- 1993 Medal of Saint Mesrop Machtots by Garéguine II Nersissian of the Great House Of Cilicie
- 1994 Vermeil Medal of the City of Paris awarded by Jacques Chirac
- 2004 Ordre des Arts et des Lettres
- 2024 Grand Vermeil Medal of the City of Paris, for his life's work.
- 2025 A square in Paris is named after Aprikian on the anniversary of his death

== Recordings ==
- 2003: Aprikian: Oeuvres Vocales et Instrumentales is a collection of vocal and instrumental pieces, including Aprikian's "Lamento", Petite suite nuptiale in both a trio and an orchestral version, "Moutn er" and Divertimento.
- Mayrig: To Armenian Mothers is a collection of songs by Armenian composers, including Aprikian's "Lamento", "Lullaby", and Petite suite nuptiale.
