= Constantine I of Armenia =

Constantine I of Armenia may refer to:

- Constantine I, Prince of Armenia (1035–1040 – c. 1100), who ruled from 1095 – c. 1100
- Constantine I, King of Armenia (1278 – c. 1310), who ruled from 1298–1299
- Constantine I of Cilicia, catholicos in 1221–1267
