= Vazgen I =

Patriarch of the Armenian Apostolic Church (1955–1994)

His Holiness, National Hero of Armenia Vazgen / Vazken I
- Supreme Patriarch and Catholicos of All Armenians
- Church: Armenian Apostolic Church
- See: Mother See of Holy Etchmiadzin
- Installed: 1955
- Term ended: 1994
- Predecessor: George VI
- Successor: Karekin I

Personal details
- Born: Levon Garabed Baljian; September 20, 1908 Bucharest, Kingdom of Romania
- Died: August 18, 1994 (aged 85) Yerevan, Armenia
- Buried: Mother Cathedral of Holy Etchmiadzin

Vazgen I also Vazken I of Bucharest (Armenian: Վազգէն Ա Բուխարեստցի), born Levon Garabed Baljian (Լևոն Կարապետ Աբրահամի Պալճեան; September 20, 1908 – August 18, 1994) was the Catholicos of All Armenians between 1955 and 1994. Serving for a total of 39 years, his tenure as Catholicos was the fourth longest in the history of the Armenian Apostolic Church.

A native of Romania, Vazgen began his career as a philosopher, before becoming a Doctor of Theology and a member of the local Armenian clergy. The leader of the Armenian Apostolic Church hierarchy in Romania, he became Catholicos in 1955, moving to Soviet Armenia. Vazgen led the Armenian Church through the Cold War and the dissolution of the Soviet Union. He was the first Catholicos in post-Soviet Armenia.

== Early life and education ==
Vazgen was born in Bucharest to a family belonging to the Armenian community of Romania. His father was a shoemaker and his mother was a schoolteacher. He received his primary education in Odessa, where his family briefly lived. The young Levon Baljian did not initially pursue the Church as a profession, instead graduating from the University of Bucharest's Faculty of Philosophy and Letters. After graduation, he became a philosopher and published a series of scholarly articles.

As his interests began to shift from philosophy to theology, Baljian studied Armenian Apostolic Theology and Divinity in Athens, Greece. In 1943, he took the name "Vazgen" and gained the title of vardapet, an ecclesiastical rank for learned preachers and teachers in the Armenian Apostolic Church roughly equivalent to receiving a doctorate in theology. He was ordained a bishop in 1951.

== Catholicos ==
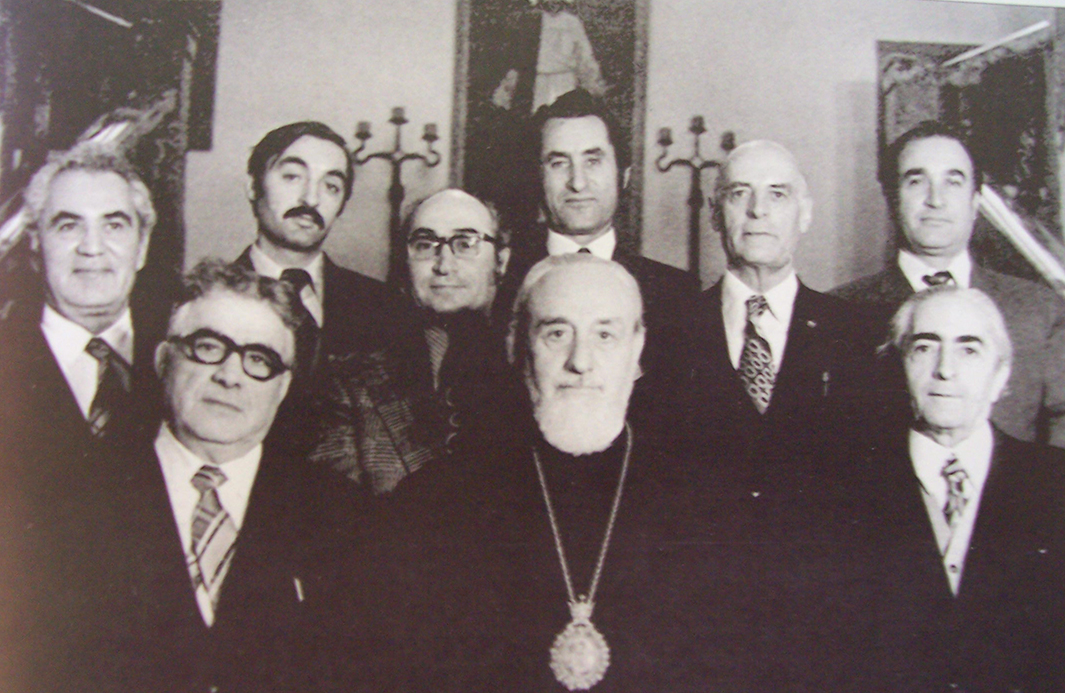
Vazgen I with the Architectural Commission of the Mother See of Holy Etchmiadzin (1970–1988). First row from left: Varazdat Harutyunyan, Vazgen I, K. Altunyan. Second row from left: Baghdasar Arzoumanian, H. Babakhanian, Grigor Khanjyan, A. Galikyan, M. Hovhannisyan.

Vazgen's rise through the hierarchy of the Church culminated during the Khrushchev thaw, when, on September 30, 1955, he was elected Catholicos of All Armenians, becoming one of the youngest Catholicoi in the history of the Armenian Apostolic Church. During his tenure as Catholicos, Vazgen managed to assert some independence for his church under Soviet rule. He was known for his outreach to the Armenian diaspora and his advocacy for the restoration and preservation of Armenian monasteries, churches, and cathedrals, including Etchmiadzin Cathedral. Working with the artist Grigor Khanjyan, Vazgen managed to transfer a number of khachkars from the Armenian cemetery in Julfa to Etchmiadzin, thus saving them from later destruction. He also facilitated the transfer of important manuscripts and materials to the Matenadaran, including Tovma Artsruni's History of the House of Artsrunik and the Zeytun and Malatia Gospels illuminated by Toros Roslin.

In May 1956, Vazgen unsuccessfully appealed to Nikolai Bulganin for the unification of Nagorno-Karabakh with Soviet Armenia. An advocate for recognition of the Armenian genocide, he also helped ease protestors during the 1965 Yerevan demonstrations. A proponent of ecumenical dialogue, Vazgen attended the Conference of Addis Ababa, in order to strengthen ties to the other Miaphysite churches. Under his tenure, the Armenian Apostolic Church joined the World Council of Churches and the Conference of European Churches. In collaboration with Alex Manoogian, Vazgen saved a number of church treasures by establishing the Alex Manoogian Museum of the Mother Church in 1982.

During the Karabakh movement, Vazgen wrote to Mikhail Gorbachev, once again appealing for the unification of Nagorno-Karabakh with Soviet Armenia. He assisted the relief efforts for the 1988 Armenian earthquake, and oversaw the restoration of the Artsakh, Syunik, and Gougark dioceses of the Armenian Church in 1989. The Catholicos blessed the Declaration of State Sovereignty of Armenia in August 1990 and witnessed the independence of Armenia in 1991. He was the first recipient of the title National Hero of Armenia under Levon Ter-Petrosyan. He died in Yerevan on August 18, 1994, after a long illness from cancer.

== Gallery ==
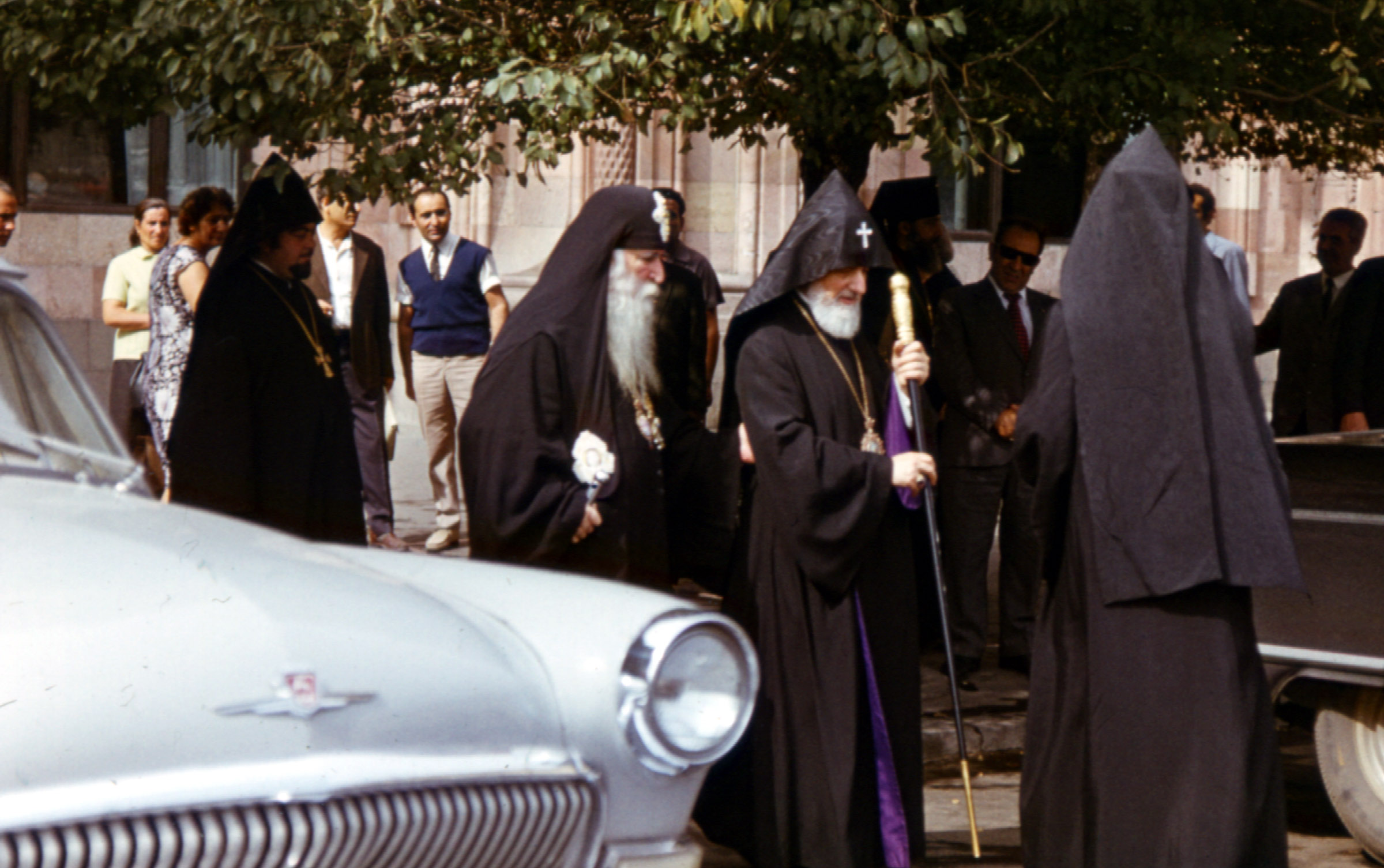
Vazgen I and David V, Catholicos-Patriarch of All Georgia, 1972

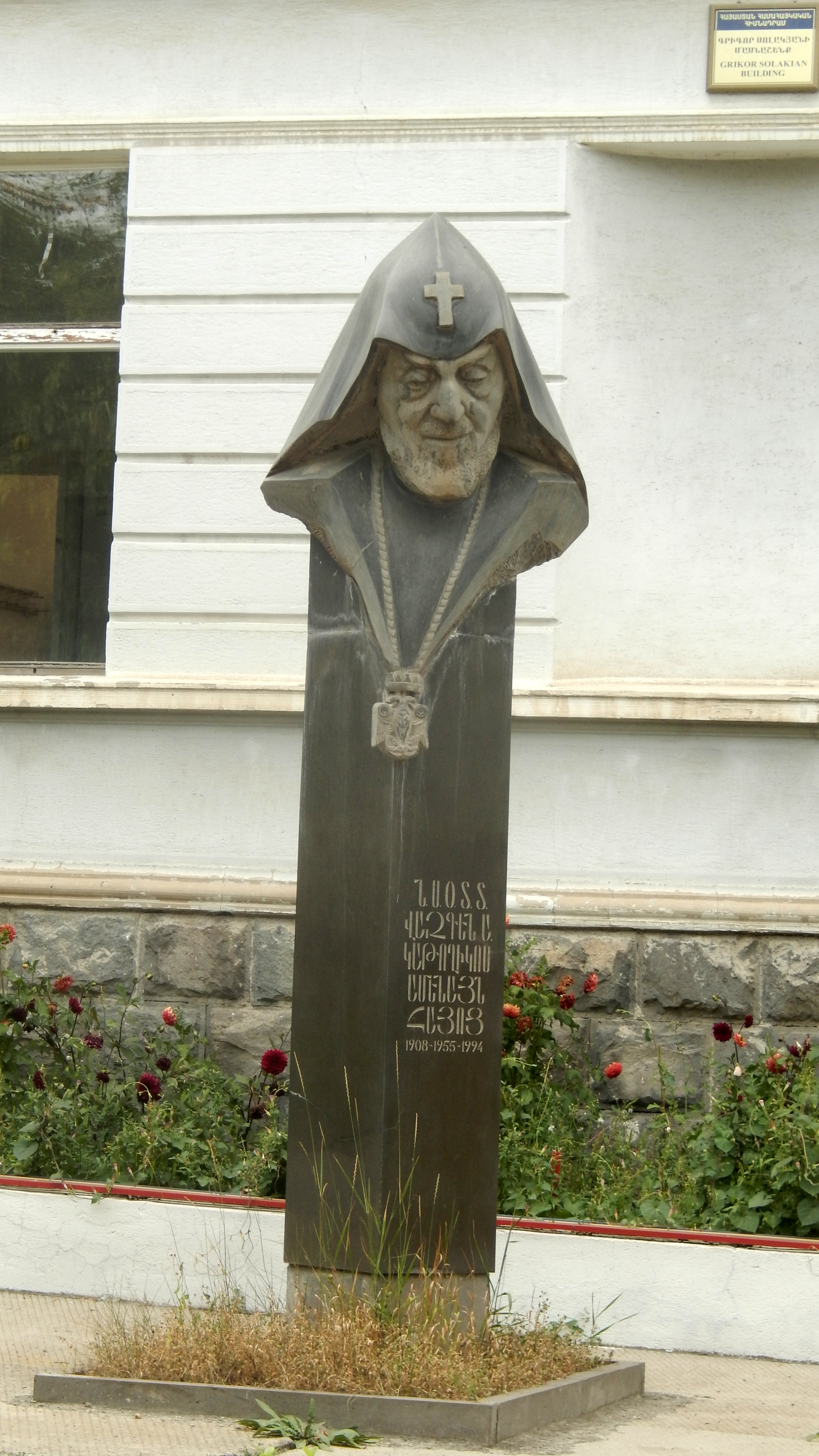
Statue in front of Vazgen I Elementary School in Vanadzor

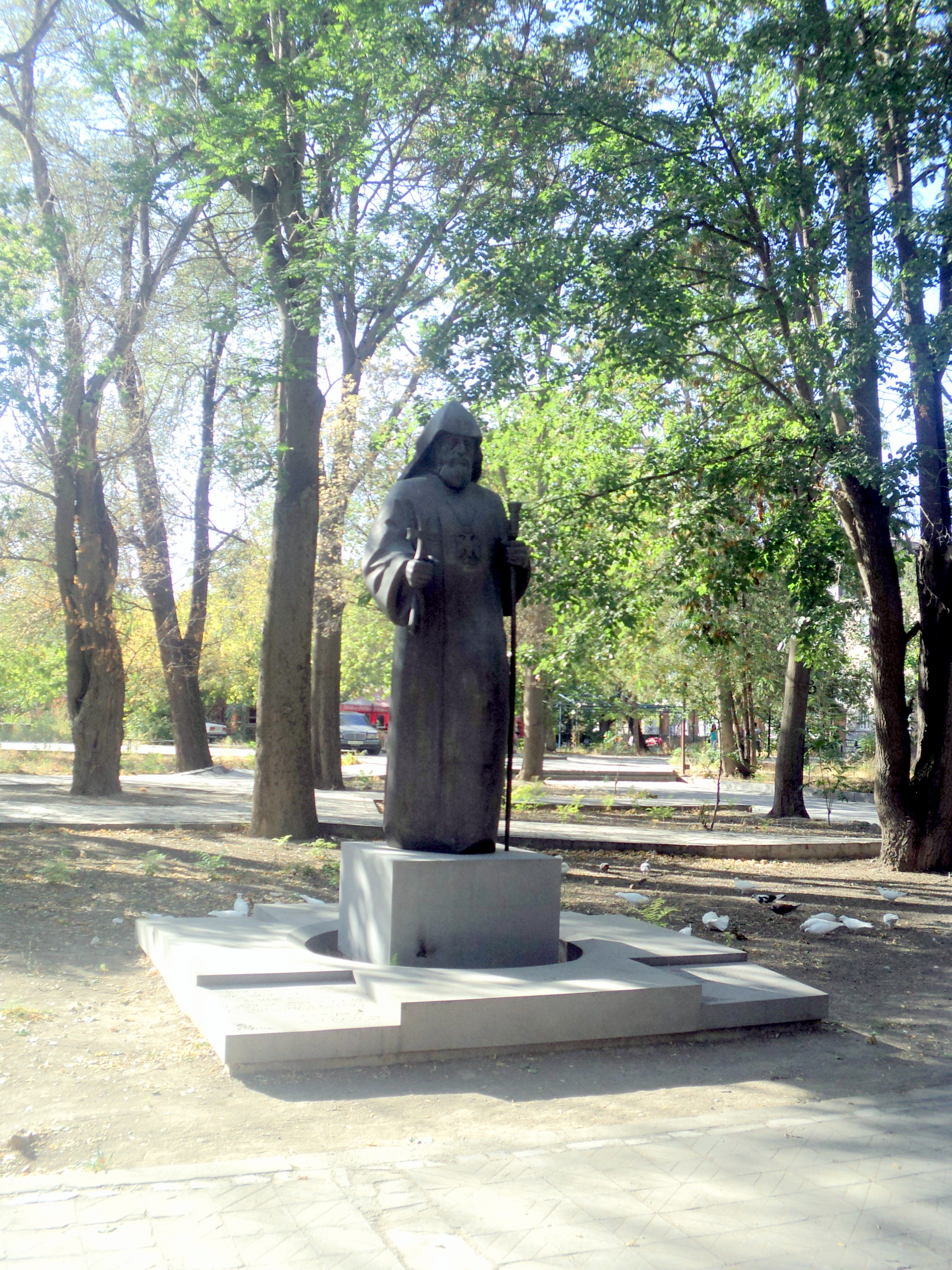
Statue in a park in Echmiadzin

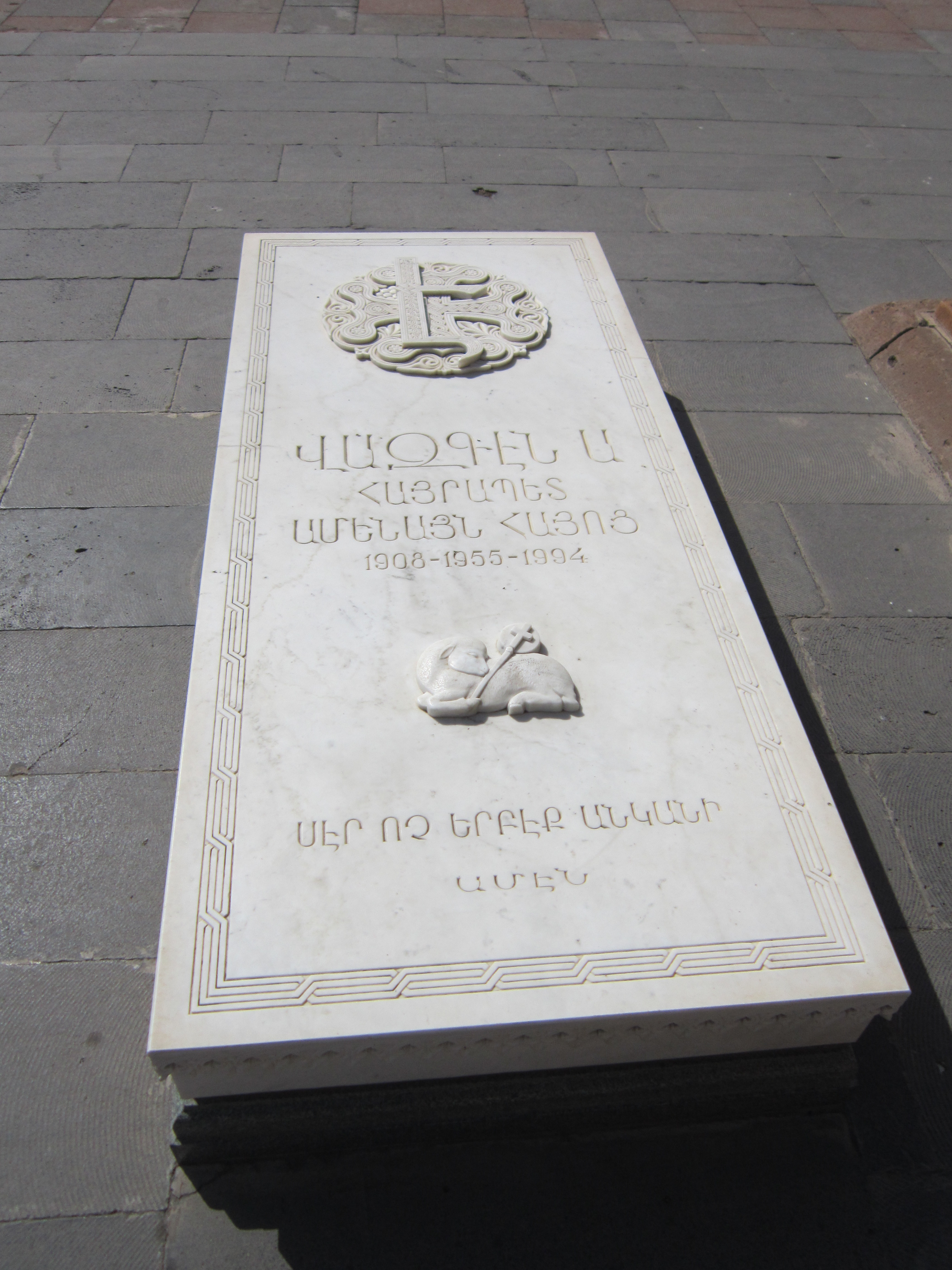
Vazgen I's tombstone

== Awards ==
- National Hero of Armenia (28.07.1994) — for exceptional services in preserving and enhancing national and spiritual values
- Order of the Red Banner of Labor (09.19.1988) — for peacekeeping activities and in connection with the eightieth anniversary of his birth
- Order of Friendship of Peoples (09.19.1978) — for patriotic activities in defense of peace and in connection with the seventieth anniversary of his birth
- Order of the Badge of Honor (09.19.1968) — for great patriotic activity in defense of peace and in connection with the sixtieth anniversary of his birth
- Order of the Star of the Romanian Socialist Republic (1952)
- Gold Peace Medal named after Frederic Joliot-Curie (1962) – for his great contribution to the promotion of peace
- Gold Medal of the Soviet Peace Committee (1968)

Oriental Orthodox titles
Preceded by George VI	Catholicoi of the Mother See of Holy Echmiadzin and All Armenians; 1955–1994	Succeeded by Karekin I
