= List of compositions by Garbis Aprikian =

This is a list of compositions by Garbis Aprikian. He said in an interview that in his compositions, he took melody mostly from Armenian music, but fused it with Western classical music's harmonies when he arranged themes from Armenian folk music, calling it a "'noble' transcription of tradition".

== Compositions ==
- Kovk, praises and wishes for chorus
- Hymn, blessings for chorus
- Scherzo for chorus
- Petite suite nuptiale (Little Nuptial Suite) in four movements for mezzo-soprano, harp and cello
- Oror (Lullaby) for mezzo-soprano, harp and cello (also in a choral version)
- Sweet is the night, mélodie
- Ledjag, mélodie
- Lamento, complaint of an orphan
- Nocturne, fugue
- Es Kechir, dance for voice, chorus and orchestra
- Ninam—Niman, dance for voice, chorus and orchestra
- Dark Sky for chorus and orchestra
- Nocturne on a theme by Komitas for voice, chorus and orchestra
- Tchellar—Tchellar, divertimento for soloists, chorus and orchestra
- Orchestral Prelude on a poem by of Gh. Aghayan for orchestra
- The birth of David of Sassoon, oratorio

== Revised works ==
- Nanor, description of a pilgrimage, for soloists, chorus and orchestra
- Aphegha'n (Holy Legend), lyric drama in one act, harmonisation, orchestration

== Arrangements of popular sources ==
- Hay Yeghpaïne for chorus and orchestra
- Togh Gorentchin for chorus and orchestra
- Iprev Ardziv for chorus and orchestra
- Lamentation of Vaspourakan for chorus and orchestra
- Karahissar for solo, chorus and orchestra

== Arrangements of music by Komitas ==
- Braves of Sipan for chorus and orchestra
- Gali Yerk for soloists, chorus and orchestra

== Arrangements of music by Patmagrian ==
- Haralé for soloists, chorus and orchestra
- Yar Gula for chorus and orchestra
- Yalali for chorus and orchestra
- Six Armenian songs for piano to young pianists

== Arrangements of music by Ganatchian ==
- The Willow, mélodie with orchestra
- The Dream of Alvarte, mélodie with orchestra
- Choucho for chorus with orchestra
- With the Roses' for chorus and orchestra
