= Zeytun Gospels =

1256 Armenian illuminated manuscript by T'oros Roslin

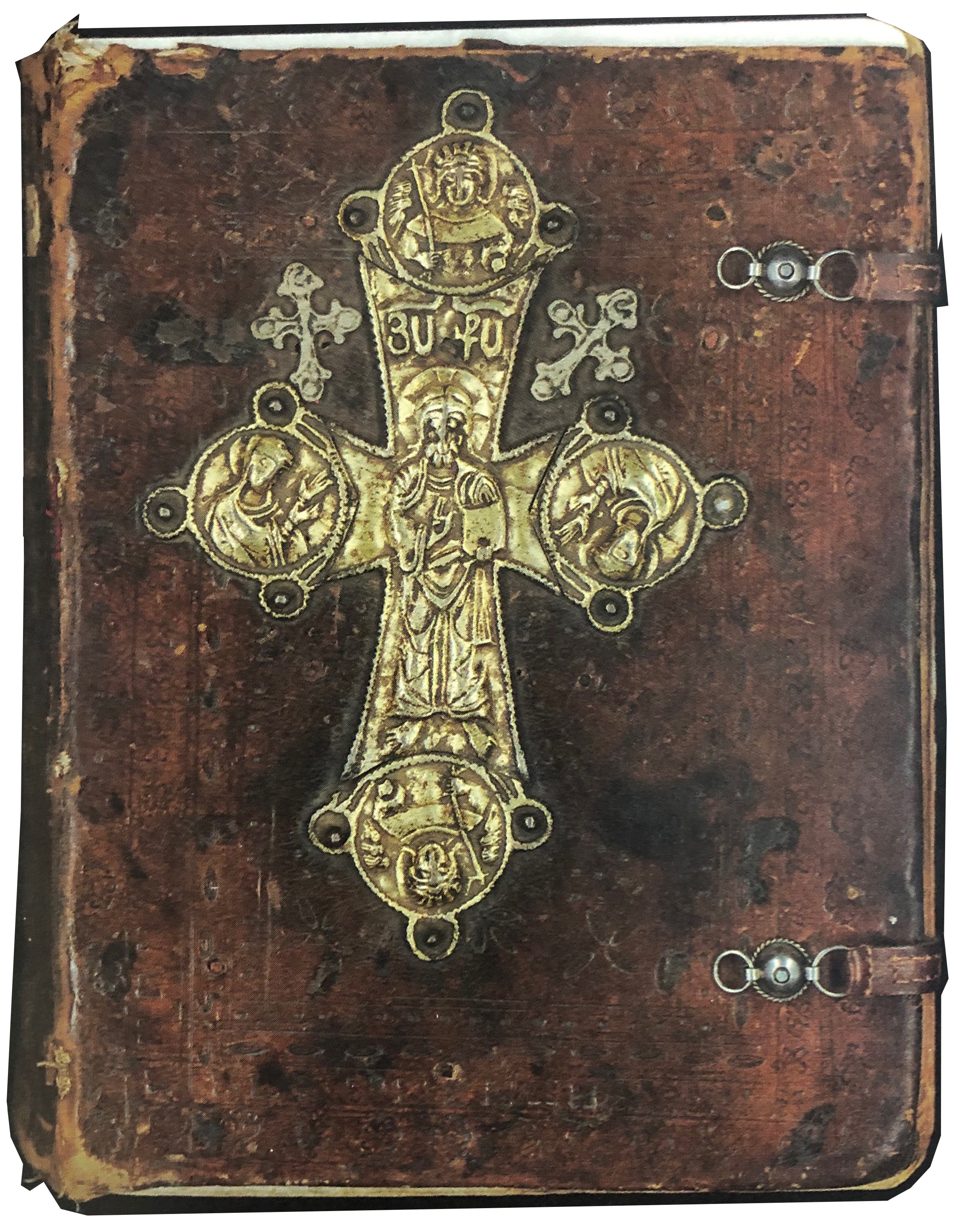
- Illustrated by: T'oros Roslin
- Patron: Catholicos Constantine I
- Language: Armenian
- Date: 1256
- Manuscript(s): MS 10450

The Zeytun Gospels of 1256 AD (Matenadaran, MS. 10450) is an Armenian illuminated manuscript in the Armenian language by artist and ordained priest T'oros Roslin. The Zeytun Gospels consists of four tabernacles, four evangelists, four namesakes, ornaments and decorations. The manuscript's patron was Catholicos Constantine I of Bardzrberd (1221–1267) and was commissioned for his godson Levon (b. 1236). It was transcribed in a scriptorium at the fortress Hromklay, "the God protected castle", in Cilician Armenia. Hromklay was also known as The School of Miniature Painting at the Catholicosate. The Hromklan (Roman-Kar, Klein Roman) scriptorium was at its peak while Roslin worked there on the Zeytun Gospels. The manuscript was later reintroduced as the Zeytun Gospels named after the mountain village of Zeytun (modern day Süleymanli) during the late Ottoman Empire.

Most of the manuscript, excluding the canon tables which are kept at the J. Paul Getty Museum, are at the Matenadaran (Mesrop Mashtots Institute of Ancient Manuscripts) in Yerevan, the capital of Armenia.

== History ==
=== Origin ===
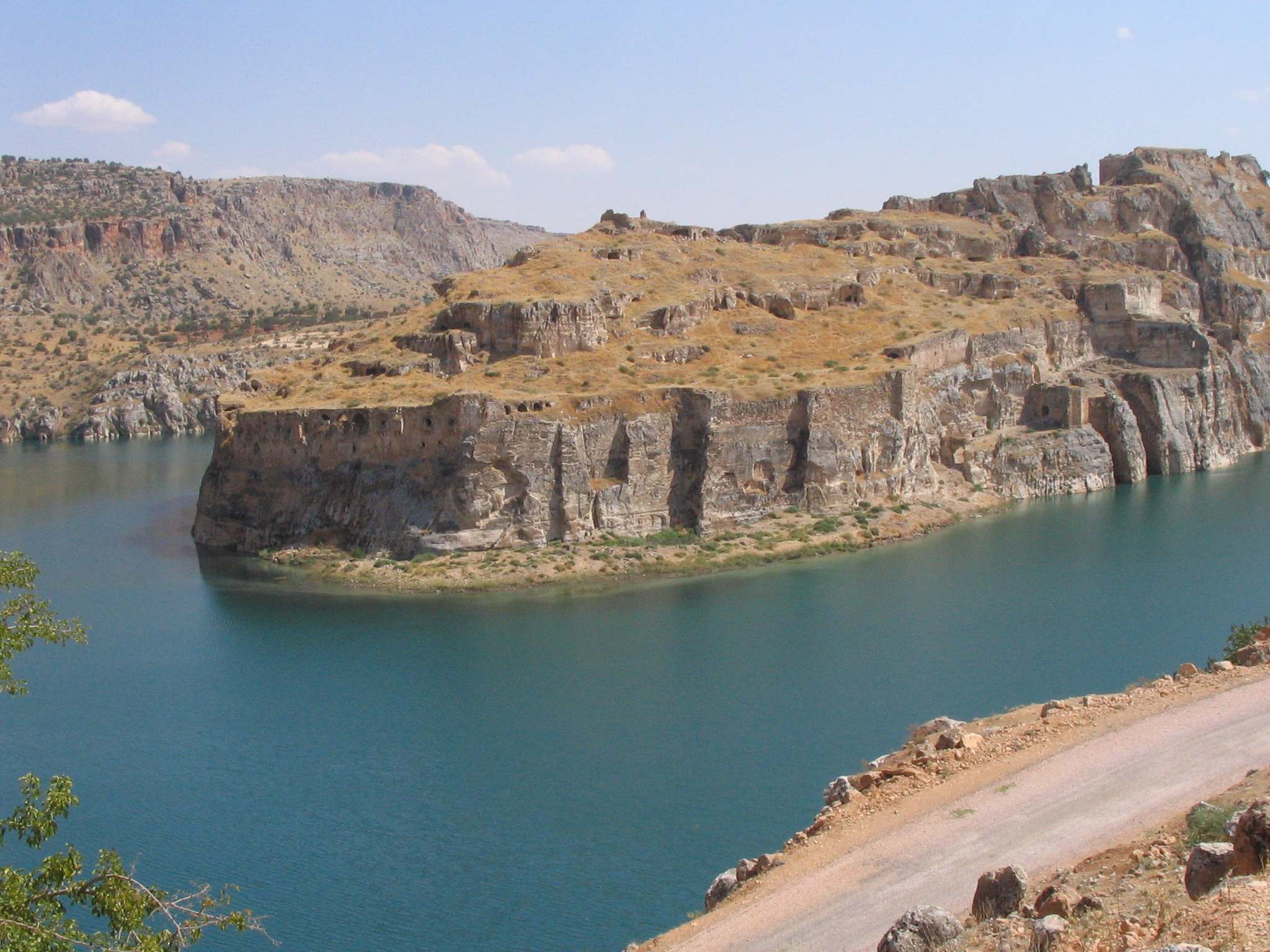
Fortress of Hromklay

By the early fourth and fifth centuries, Armenians adopted Christianity and chose Armenian as their liturgical language, not Greek or Syriac. St. Gregory the Illuminator was the one who Christianized Armenia, which served as Armenia's link to the West. Almost a thousand years later, the artist T'oros Roslin illustrated liturgical texts from the fifth century, paying homage to earlier Cilician illuminators while adapting Armenian manuscripts to the thirteenth century position of Eastern Christianity.

The Zeytun Gospels was Roslin's first signed manuscript. Roslin studied under Yovhannes, a priest at Hromklay. While there, Roslin transcribed portraits and texts from Yovhannes's work into the Zeytun Gospels. The manuscript was created for Catholicos Constantine I, a prominent patron of the arts, who contributed to the development of sacred painting and manuscript production in Armenia. Roslin worked under him in Constantinople, as well as for the royal family. Roslin was considered the best artist at the Hromklan scriptorium.

=== Sixteenth and seventeenth centuries ===
Sometime between the sixteenth and seventeenth centuries, the manuscript went from the village of Furnus to Zeytun, a town cradled by the Taurus Mountains, due to Furnus being destroyed. The use of the name Zeytun was first documented in 1536 from a copied manuscript titled the "Zeytun Citadel" and in 1545 was first inscribed in the town of Zeytun itself. The manuscript was rebound during the seventeenth century, keeping the original gold crucifix and medallions. Armenian bookbinding changed very little between the fourteenth through the eighteenth centuries. The Armenian language dictated which side manuscripts were bound. The language is read from left to right, so the manuscripts were bound on the left.

=== Modern history ===
Zeytun priests added notes of significant events and various messages into the colophons of the Zeytun Gospels. They essentially noted Zeytun's more recent history and turned the gospel into a living repository. Specifically in the nineteenth century, three colophons were written with deteriorating articulation and heavy vernacular, two of which were dated 1852 and 1859 and pertained to the Ottoman army. During the 1880s, the Monsignor of the Catholic Armenians of Marash attempted to sell the manuscript for its weight in gold (which is just over 7 pounds). The Zeytun people rejected the sale of the manuscript. In 1887 at the Church of the Holy Mother of God, the gospel escaped a fire, guarded by Surenian ishkhans. The ishkhan and the church council kept the gospel safe after 1908 in a secret compartment in the northern wall of the church's baptism chamber in an iron box with two keys.

=== Armenian genocide ===
At the beginning of the Armenian genocide, in the spring of 1915, the village of Zeytun was the first to be invaded by the Turks. During the invasion, the people of Zeytun were either exiled or killed and, in the process, the Zeytun Gospels was taken from its repository. Sometime during the following years, the canon tables were taken out of the manuscript. Nearly five years after the start of the Armenian genocide, after the Battle of Marash in 1920, the manuscript was then given to James Lyman, an American missionary, by Father Khachadur Der Ghazarian for safe keeping. After the end of the Armenian genocide, the manuscript (excluding the canon tables) meandered through many hands for decades until it finally found its way to the Matenadaran (the translation of Matenadaran is "repository of manuscripts" and holds over 23,000 manuscripts, including the national collection of Armenia).

In 1994, the canon tables were sold to the J. Paul Getty Museum for $950,000 after being exhibited at the Pierpont Morgan Library in New York. Previously owned by the Atamian Family in Watertown, Massachusetts, it would be the first and last time a Roslin was on the art market. In 2015, an agreement was signed between the Getty and the Western Prelacy of the Armenian Apostolic Church of America, which acknowledged that the Armenian Church was the rightful owner of the canon tables, but that the manuscript pages would remain in the Getty "in order to ensure their preservation and widespread exhibition."

== Stylistic elements ==
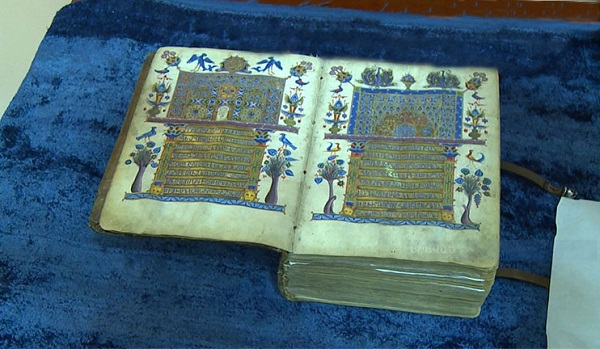
Zeytun Gospel 1256 AD, at the Matendaran, Yerevan Armenia.

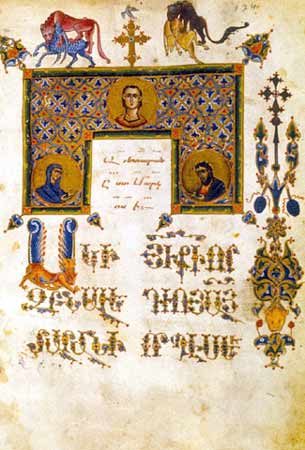
Gospel. Erevan, Matenadaran, Ms. 10450, known as the "Zeytun Gospel". Beginning of the Gospel of St. Mark

The Zeytun Gospels set an artistic standard for later Armenian artists. Roslin is thought to have had a yearning for realism, painting from real life, which is reflected in the manuscript. It was also written in a round slanted text with pointed corners called bolorgir. Even though he modeled this manuscript after other scribes, he tended to intensify his narratives and added exquisite illuminations into the margins, which were unrivaled for the time in Armenian art.

He also introduced Western motifs into this manuscript, which could have been a visual nod towards pro-union Armenian forces (which echoed earlier connections with Rome created by Nerses of Lambron). In the Zeytun Gospels, Roslin combined Byzantine elements with Cilician designs and Western motifs creating a new distinctive style. The Western motifs were late in Roslin's career and were not numerous. It is unclear as to why a principal illuminator under the catholicos of the Armenian Church would be allowed to insert Western elements.

=== The canon tables ===
The manuscripts canon tables are copied from the L'viv Gospels and the Gospels of Nerses, made at Het'um of Lambron's scriptorium at Hromklay, which share many similar details. Those details include how the cranes, quails and rooster are perched atop of the tables along with the details of the birds on the headpieces and the placement of the trees next to the canon tables. The canon tables are some of the most decorated illuminations in the manuscript. Roslin highlighted these animals in an architectural structure embellished in gold and vibrant jewel tones.

=== Roslin's colophons ===
Medieval colophons were typically written by priests, scribes, or illuminators. They were used to ward off the sale of the manuscript, give information about the work's creators, describe circumstances around its creation, or to encourage manuscripts to be left at their given repositories. Roslin recounts in his colophons his appreciation to his teachers Yovhannes (Hovhannes), Skewray and Kirakos, who were thought of as the greatest masters of manuscripts in the 1240s and 1250s. Roslin wrote many colophons in the Zeytun Gospels margins, one of which is "Whoever was unworthy who opened it [this book] and read it, it did not turn out well for him...Fathers and brothers! Open it with awe, and read it with veneration."

== Iconography ==
T'oros Roslin specifically reintroduced the Lamb of God, aligning with the gospel of 1253 by his teacher Yovhannes, which appears on the incipit page of John atop the headpiece. The Byzantine Church rejected the use of the Lamb of God in 692. By reintroducing the Lamb of God, Roslin is paying homage to the archbishop Nerses of Lambron and the Latin Church. Roslin also modeled this gospel after other works created by Skewray. He used symbols associated with the Evangelist symbols of St. Jerome in the incipit letters of the gospels: Matthew's letter is an angel, Mark has the lion sitting on his incipit letter, Luke has the ox and John has the eagle once again perched above the incipit letter. Roslin modeled his gospels this way out of respect for Nerses of Lambron, placing the Armenian Church further under the patriarchy of the Latin Church.

An example of an exceptional illumination in the margins and unique iconography from Roslin in the Zeytun Gospels is on folio 391, with the portrait of Christ walking to the Calvary carrying the heavy cross. The depiction of Christ this way is a rarity in Eastern Christian manuscripts, since typically Simon carries the cross in Byzantine and Armenian art. Roslin also shows Christ leaning from the weight of the cross going up a small knoll representing the Golgotha, similar to the style of the Moralized Bible (Oxford, MS 270b).

== Function ==
The manuscript was considered supernatural and protected by Zeytuntsis as such. Priests knew the power of the manuscript and used it for public processions. This is why it was scarcely seen, adding to its allure. It was only to be revealed during important ceremonies such as the swearing of oaths and celebrations of mass.

== Illumination gallery ==
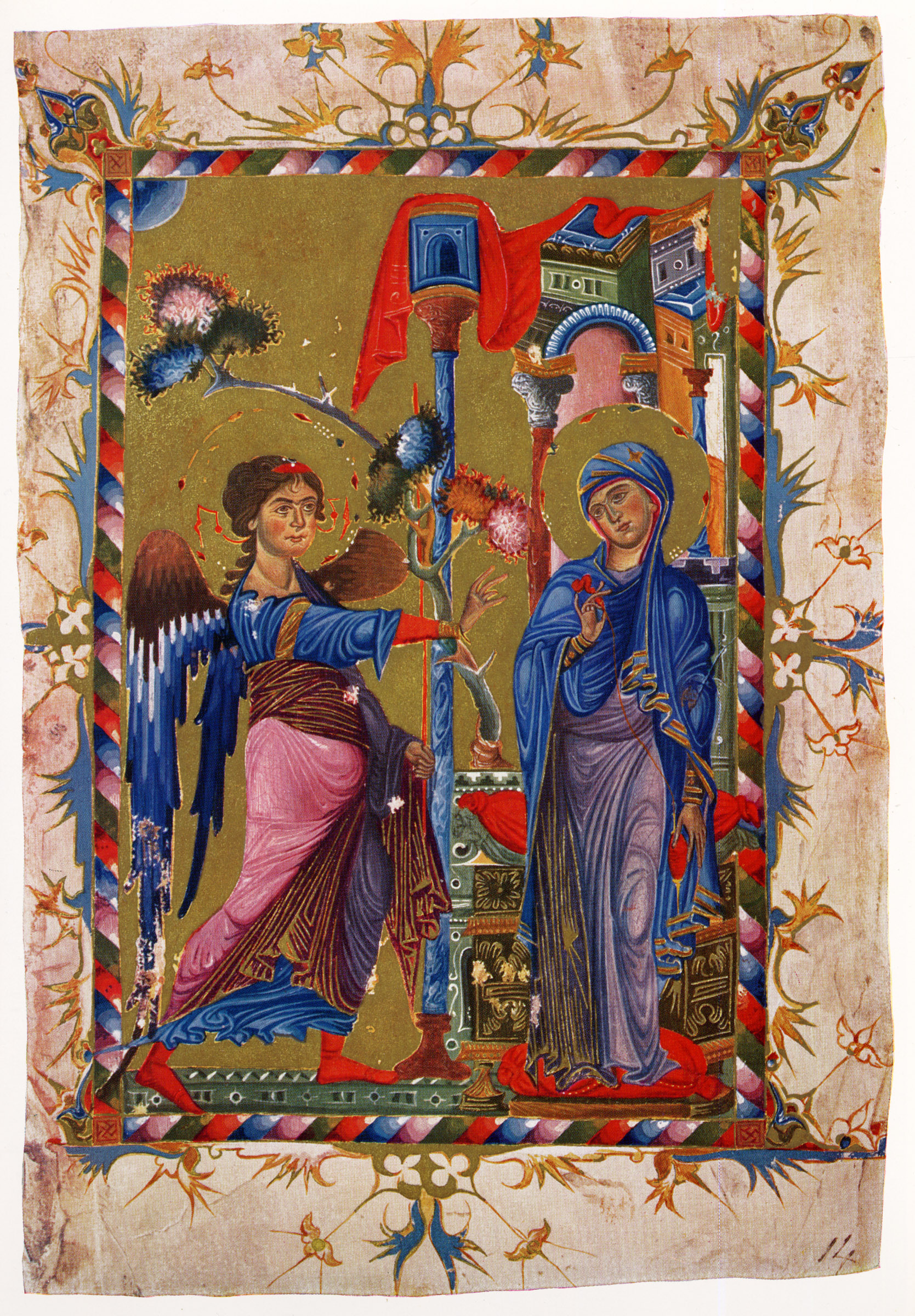
T'oros Rosilin, Zeytun Gospels of 1256, Annunciation.

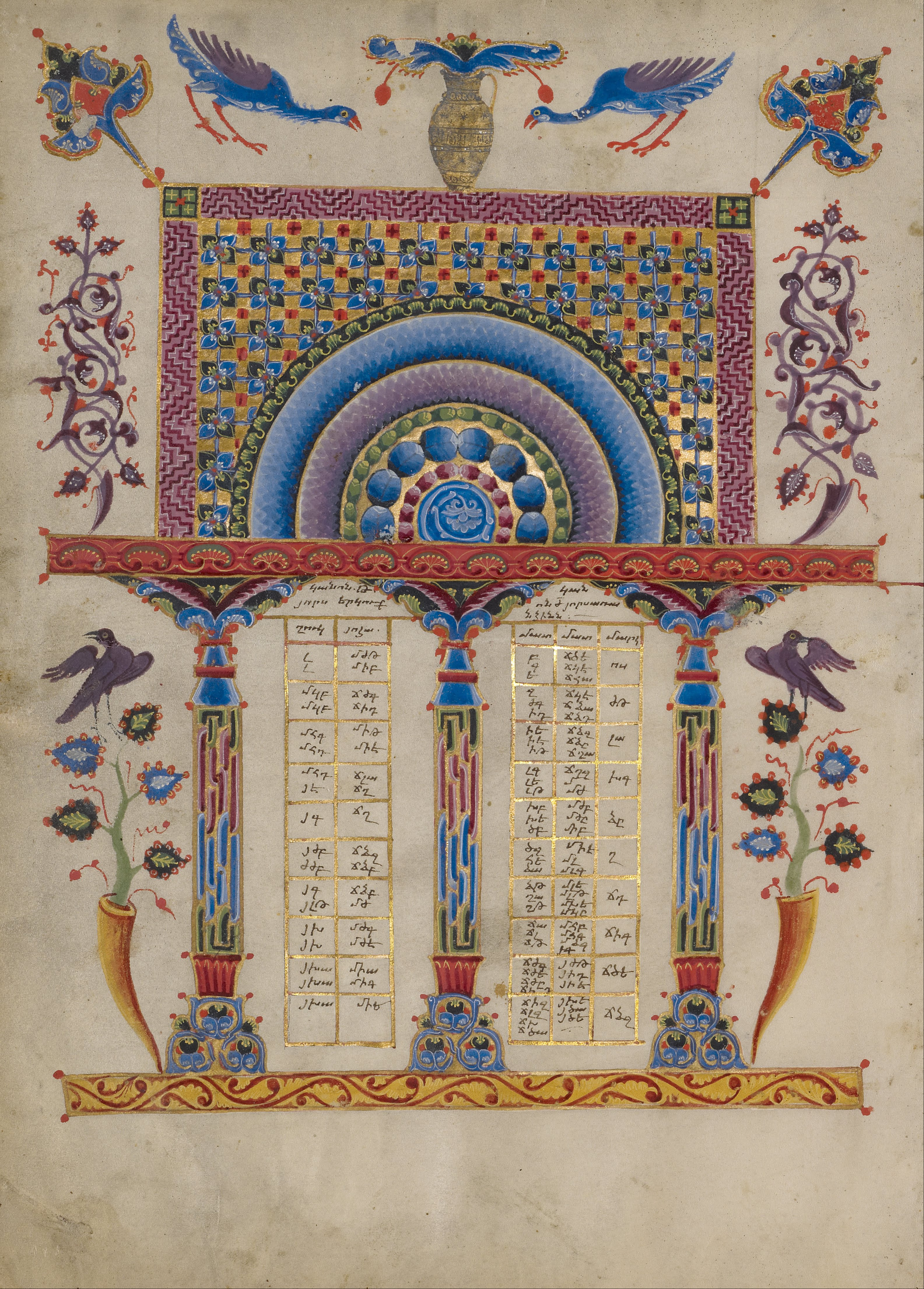

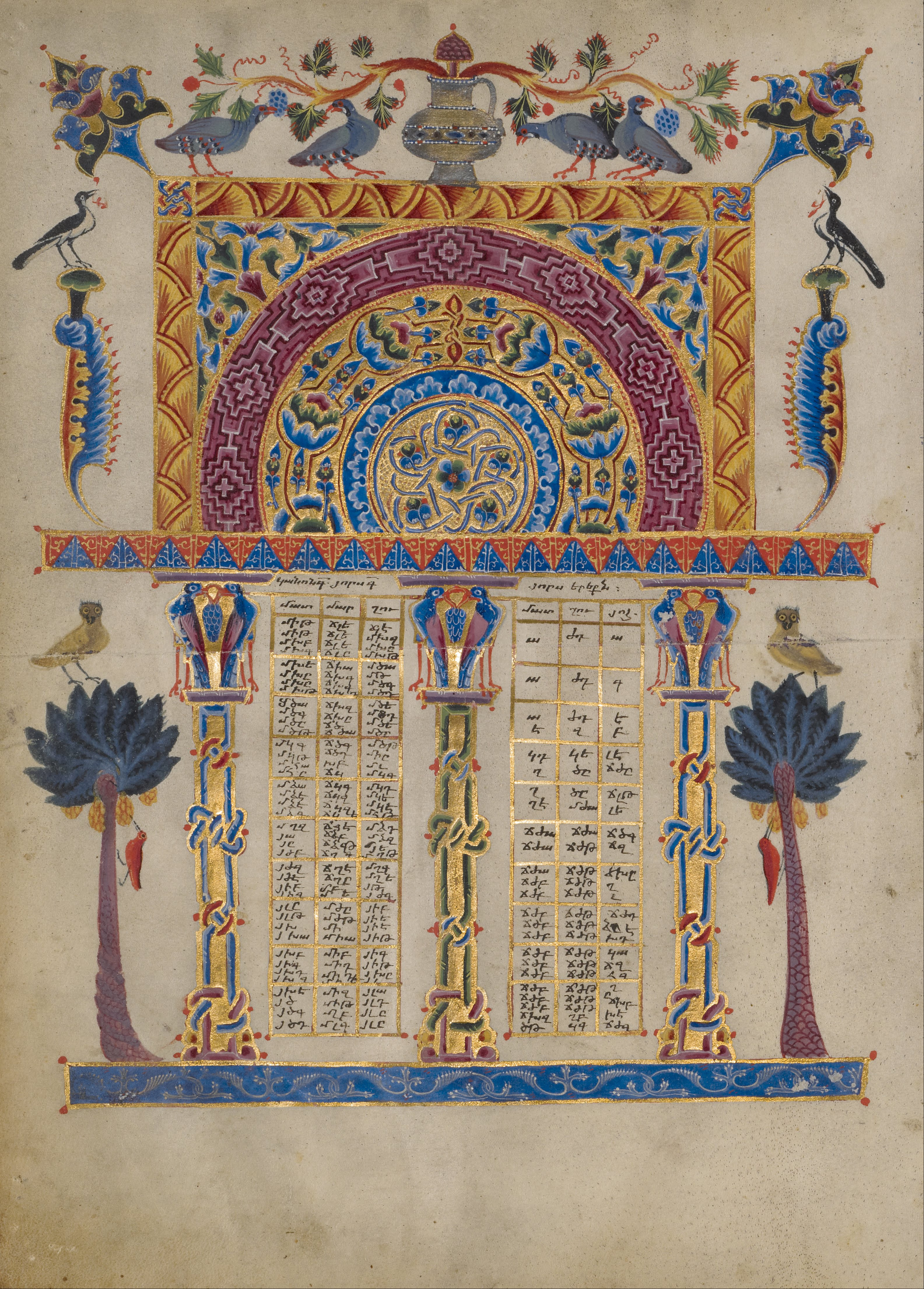

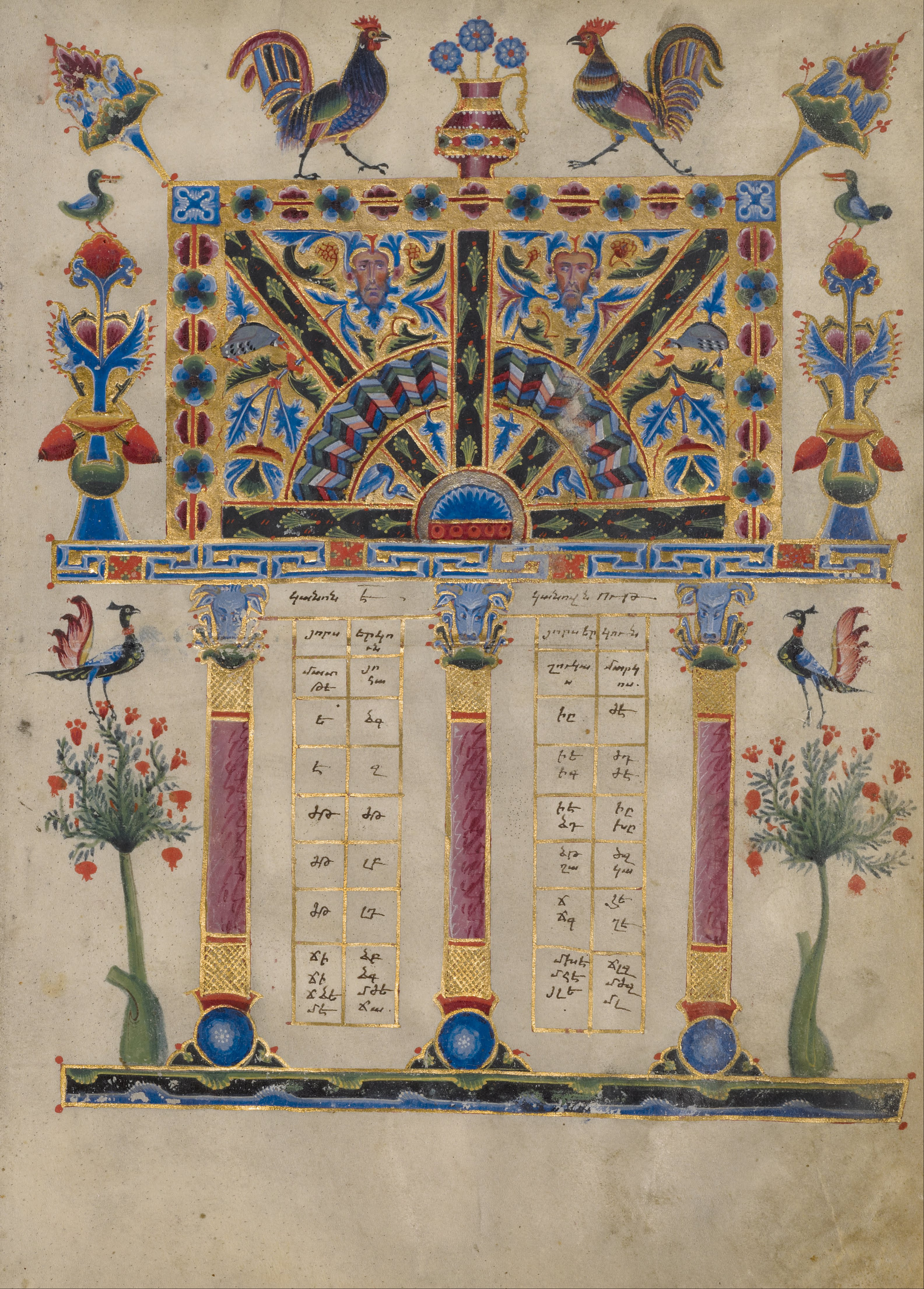

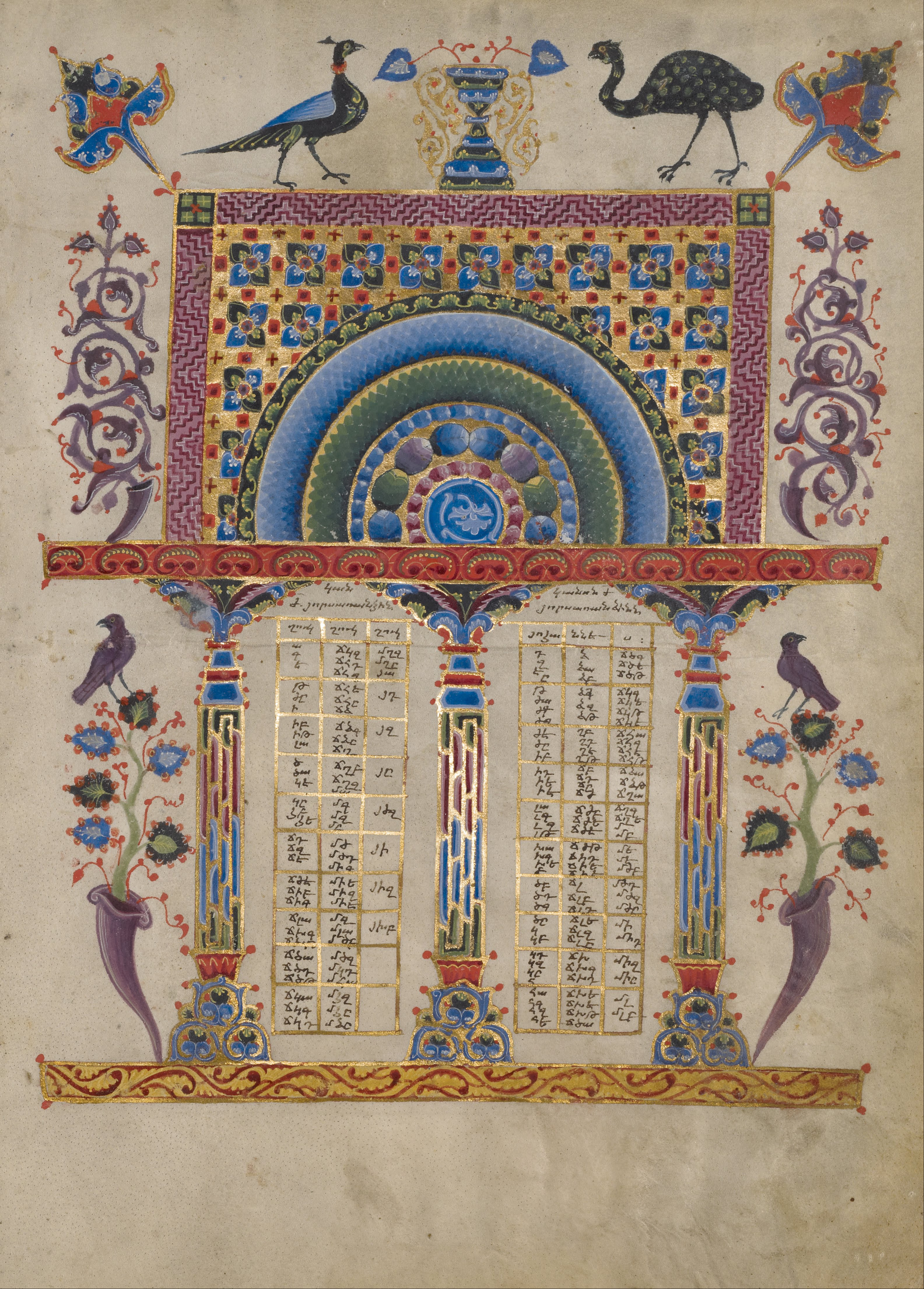

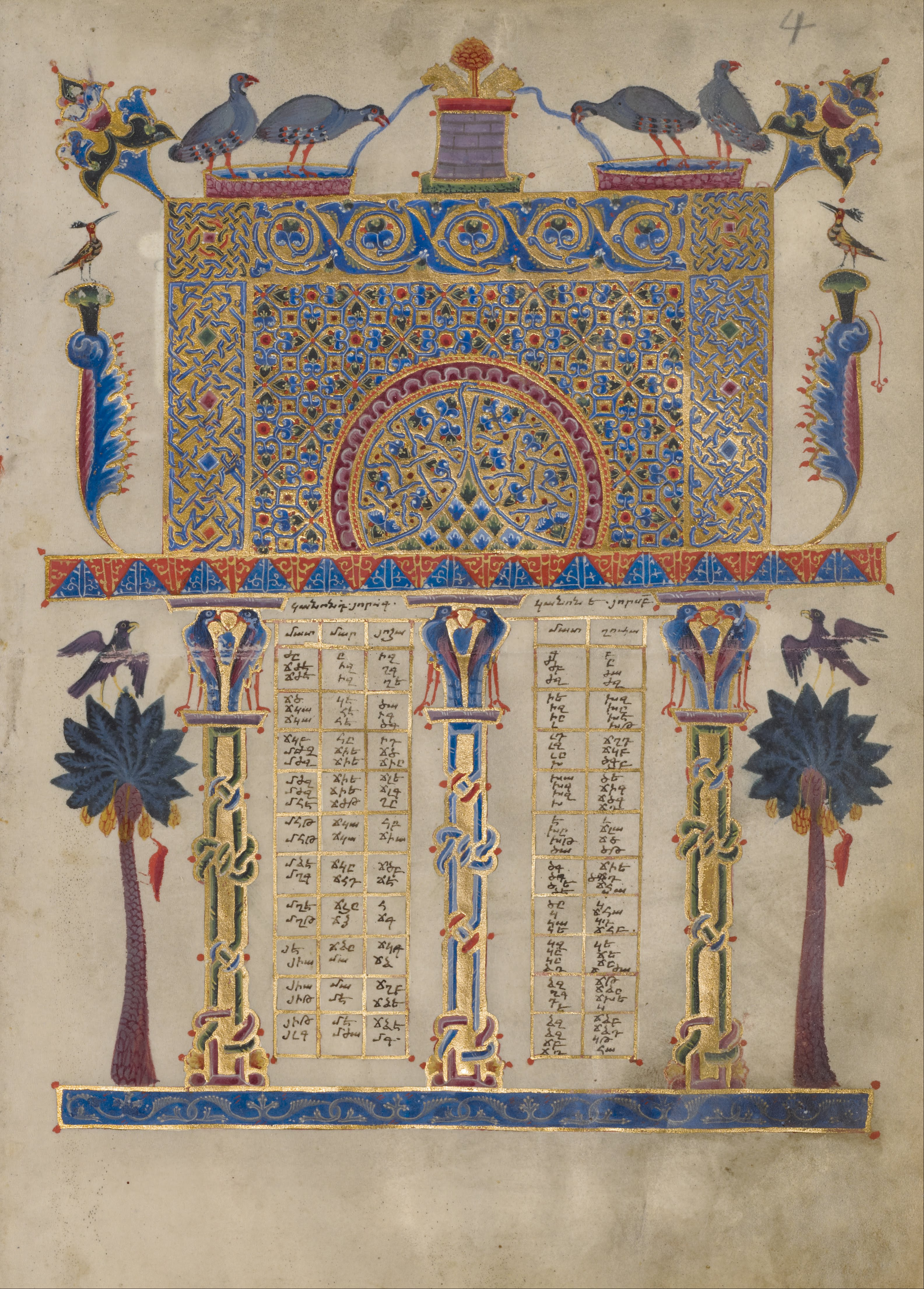

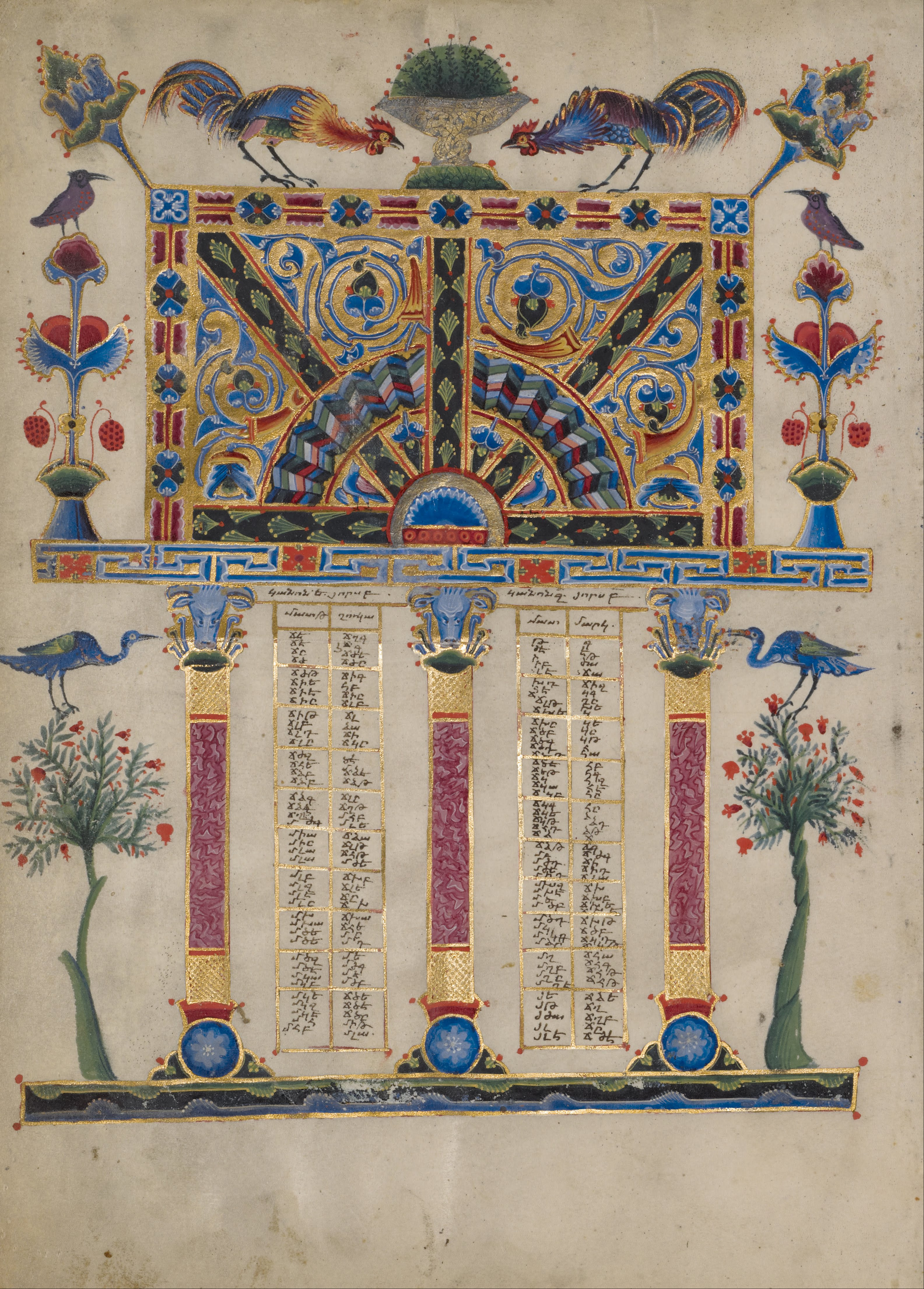

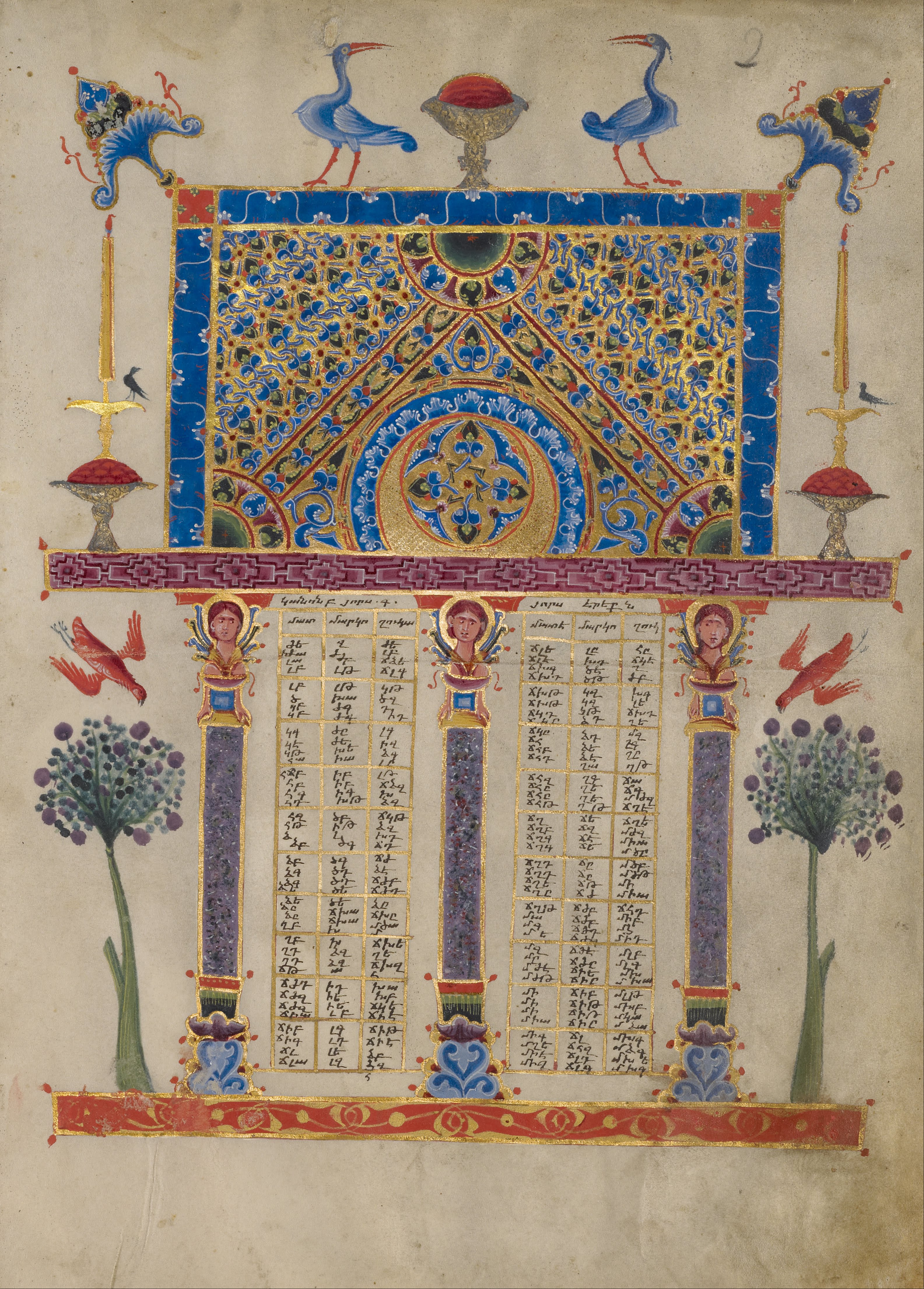

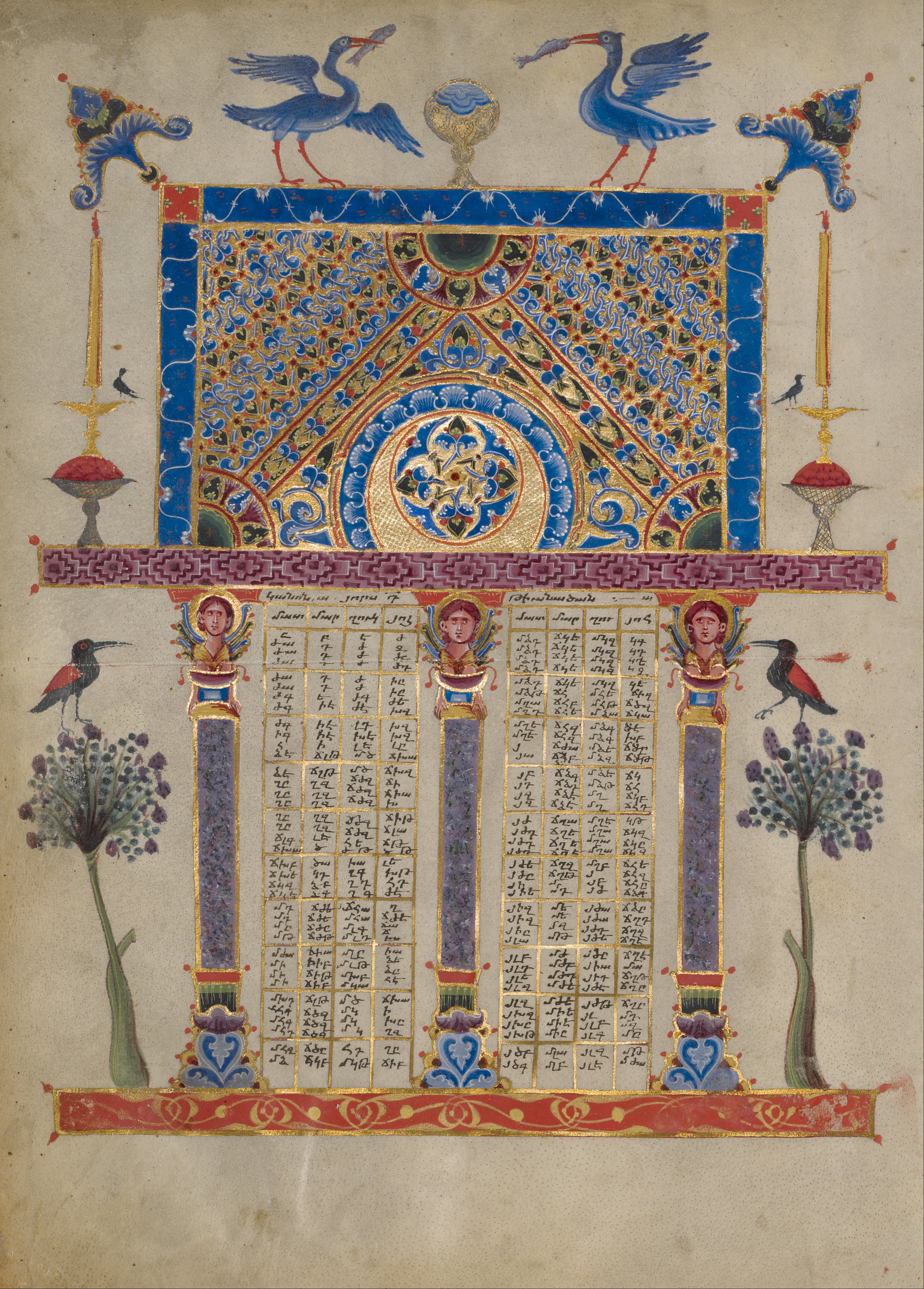
