= Levon Chookaszian =

Armenian art historian

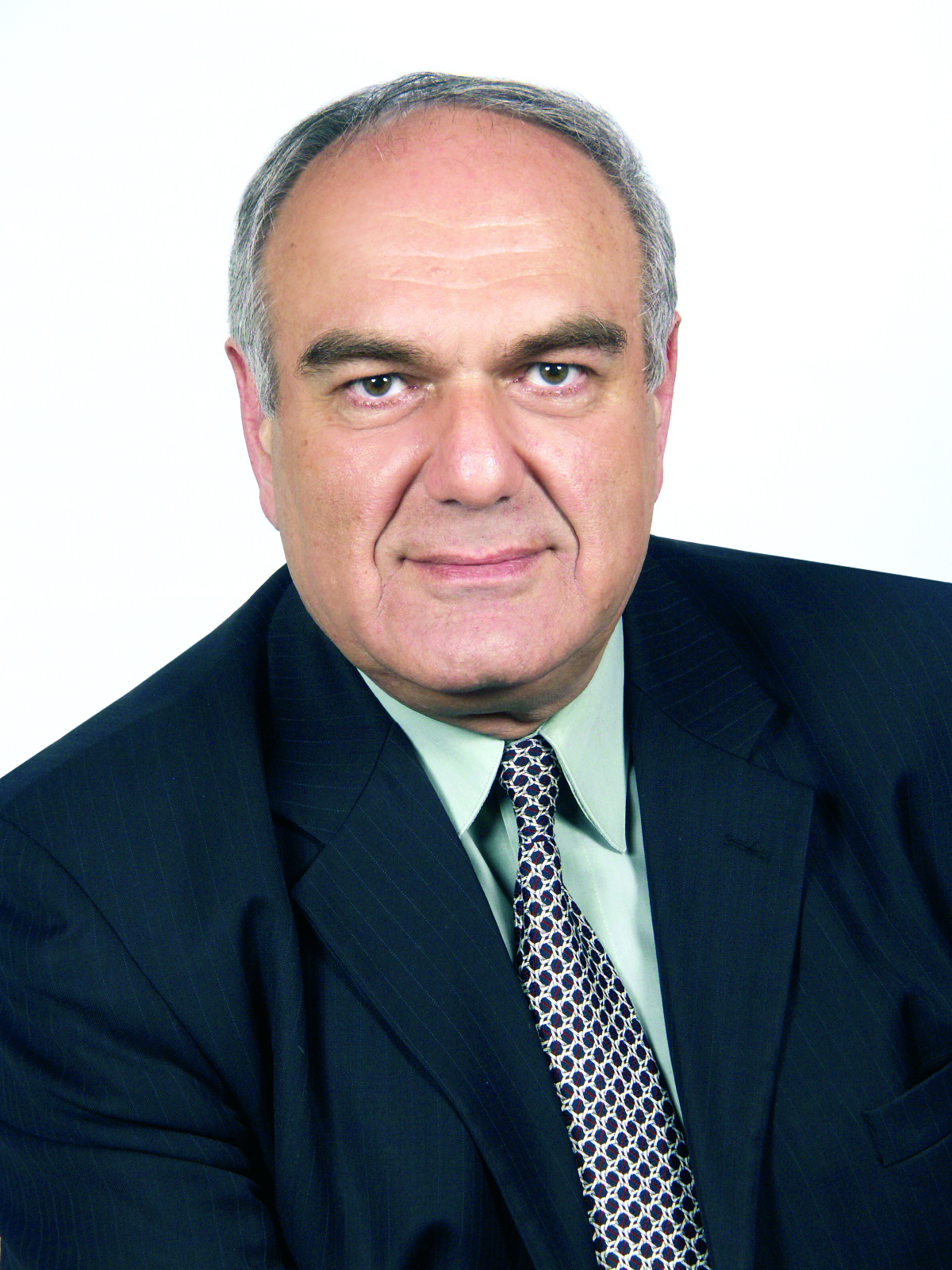
- Born: April 9, 1952 (age 74); Yerevan, Armenia
- Education: Yerevan State University
- Known for: "The Art of the 13th century Armenian Painter Grigor Tsaghkogh" ^{1} "The Art of Toros Roslin in the Context of the Cultural Relations of Cilician Armenia of the 13th century" ^{2}
- Scientific career
- Fields: Armenian studies, medieval Armenian art
- Workplaces: Yerevan State University, UNESCO
- Doctoral advisor: Victor Lazareff; Tatiana Izmailova

Notes
- ^{1} Dissertation, Georgian Academy of Sciences, 1982.^{2} Dissertation, Institute of the Art of the Ministry of Culture of Russia, Moscow, 2001.

Levon Chookaszian (Armenian: Լևոն Բաբկենի Չուգասզյան, born April 9, 1952) is an Armenian art historian and the UNESCO Chair of Armenian Art History. He is also currently the Head of Chair of History and Theory of Armenian Art at Yerevan State University. Professor Chookaszian has delivered numerous lectures, particularly on medieval Armenian art, at universities in the former Soviet Union, Europe, and the United States and taught courses on Armenian art at UCLA.

He has authored dozens of articles and essays, many on the life of Armenian miniaturist Toros Roslin, which have been published in scholarly journals, including Patma-Banasirakan Handes, Banber Yerevani Hamalsarani, Handes Amsorya, Wiener Jahrbuch fur Kunstgeschichte and Revue des Études Arméniennes.

== Selected bibliography ==
- (in Armenian) "Կիրակոս Ծաղկող (The Painter Kirakos)." Usanoghakan Gitakan Asxatank'ner. vol. 17, 1975.
- (in Armenian) "Մատենադարանի № 5576 ձեռագրի դրվագված կազմի մասին" ("On the Chased Binding of Manuscript № 5576 at the Matenadaran"). Patma-Banasirakan Handes. № 2, 1978.
- (in Armenian) "Գրիգոր Ծաղկողի «Աստվածամոր Նինջը» մանրանկարը" ("The Miniature 'The Dormition of the Virgin' of Grigor Tsaghkogh"). Patma-banasirakan Handes. № 4, 1979.
- (in German) "Rubens und die Armenier." Wiener Jahrbuch fur Kunstgeschichte, Bd. XXXII, 1979, Wien-Koln-Graz, pp. 41–48.
- (in Russian) "Творчества Тороса Рослина И Византийская Монументальая Живопись" ("The Art of T'oros Roslin and Byzantine Monumental Painting"). Banber Yerevani Hamalsarani. №. 3, 1989
- "On a Portrait of Prince Levon and Princess Keran." Journal of Armenian Studies. vol. vi. № 2, 2000-2001.
- (in French) "L’Ouvre de T’oros Roslin et l’enluminure Byzantine." Revue des Études Arméniennes. Tome 28, Paris, 2001–2002, pp. 399–424.
- "The Motif of the Sphinx in the Decoration of manuscripts Illuminated by T'oros Roslin" in Between Paris and Fresno, Armenian Studies in Honor of Dickran Kouymjian. Barlow Der Mugrdechian (ed.) (Armenian Studies Series, #13). Costa Mesa, CA: Mazda Publishers, 2008.
