= Constantine I of Cilicia =

Catholicos of the Apostolic Church from 1221 to 1267

Catholicos Constantine I (Armenian: Կոնստանդին Ա. Բարձրբերդցի) was the Catholicos of the Armenian Apostolic Church between 1221 and 1267.

A native of Barzrberd, he was said to have come to office not by nobility or riches but by his piety. He officiated at the forced wedding of Queen Zabel to Hetoum I which made them joint Armenian Cilician King and Queen. In 1259 Constantine visited the Mongol warlord Hulegu who had conquered Mesopotamia and blessed him. This was part of an alliance between Cilician Armenia and the expanding Mongol Empire. Hulegu is said to have been sympathetic to Christians, having been the son of one, and did not harm them during his campaigns.

The last years of Constantine's reign were very difficult ones. The Mamlukes of Egypt declared war on Cilician Armenia and invaded the country in 1266. The chronicler Vardan Areweltsi wrote that Constantine suffered greatly due to seeing his country ravaged and it caused his health to decline.

Especially grievous was the Battle of Mari, in which the king's sons, who had been nurtured by the Catholicos, his heir was captured and his other young son was killed. Chronicler Vardan wrote a beautiful dedication in memory of the Catholicos, who died the following year, saying "He was the sharer of grief and the fellow-mourner to many in our sinful and anger-filled age. In this time of pain and sobbing he bore it all himself and made things more mild as he was able, generously and unsparingly giving encouragement, advice, and treasure."

Religious titles
Preceded by John VI the Affluent	Catholicos of the Holy See of Cilicia; 1221–1267	Succeeded by Jacob I the Learned
