= Matenadaran =

- View of the Matenadaran (2026)
- Established: March 3, 1959; 67 years ago
- Location: 53 Mashtots Avenue, Kentron District, Yerevan, Armenia
- Coordinates: 40.19207°N 44.52113°E
- Type: Art museum, archive, research institute
- Collection size: ~23,000 manuscripts and scrolls (including fragments)
- Visitors: 132,600 (2019)
- Director: Arayik Khzmalyan
- Architects: Mark Grigorian, Arthur Meschian
- Owner: Government of Armenia
- Website: matenadaran.am

The Matenadaran (Armenian: Մատենադարան), officially the Mesrop Mashtots Institute of Ancient Manuscripts, (Note: Մեսրոպ Մաշտոցի անվան հին ձեռագրերի ինստիտուտ, Mesrop Mashtotsi anvan hin dzeragreri institut) is the largest center for the storage, study and popularization of Armenian manuscripts, combining the functions of a museum, archive and scientific institution. It holds the most extensive collection of Armenian manuscripts in existence.

It was established in 1959 on the basis of the nationalized collection of the Armenian Church, formerly held at Etchmiadzin. Its collection has gradually expanded since its establishment, mostly from individual donations. One of the most prominent landmarks of Yerevan, it is named after Mesrop Mashtots, the inventor of the Armenian alphabet, whose statue stands in front of the building. Its collection is included in the register of the UNESCO Memory of the World program.

== Name ==
The word matenadaran is a compound composed of matean, ("book" or "parchment") and daran ("repository"). Both words are of Middle Persian origin. Though it is sometimes translated as "scriptorium" in English, a more accurate translation is "repository or library of manuscripts." (Note: The Matenadaran has sometimes been called a library.) In medieval Armenia, the term matenadaran was used in the sense of a library as all books were handwritten. (Note: In modern Eastern Armenian, the term gradaran has replaced it for "library", while in Western Armenian the word matenadaran continues to be used for "library".)

Some Armenian manuscript repositories around the world are still known as matenadaran, such as the ones at the Mekhitarist monastery in San Lazzaro, Venice and the Armenian Patriarchate of Constantinople, and the Vatche and Tamar Manoukian Manuscript Depository at the Mother See of Holy Etchmiadzin. To distinguish it from others, it is often referred to as the Matenadaran of Yerevan, the Yerevan Matenadaran, or the Mashtots Matenadaran (Մաշտոցյան Մատենադարան).

== History ==
=== Historic predecessors ===
The earliest mention of a manuscript repository in Armenia was recorded in the writings of the fifth century historian Ghazar Parpetsi, who noted the existence of such a repository at the Etchmiadzin Catholicosate in Vagharshapat, the center of the Armenian Apostolic Church, where Greek and Armenian language texts were kept. Manuscript repositories existed at major monasteries in medieval Armenia, such as at Haghpat, Sanahin, Saghmosavank, Tatev, Geghard, Kecharis, Hromkla, and Bardzraberd. In some cases, monastic complexes have separate structures as manuscript repositories. Sometimes manuscripts would be transferred to caves to avoid destruction by foreign invaders. Thousands of manuscripts in Armenia were destroyed over the course of the tenth to fifteenth centuries during the Turkic and Mongol invasions. According to the medieval Armenian historian Stepanos Orbelian, the Seljuk Turks were responsible for the burning of over 10,000 Armenian manuscripts in Baghaberd in 1170.

=== Background ===
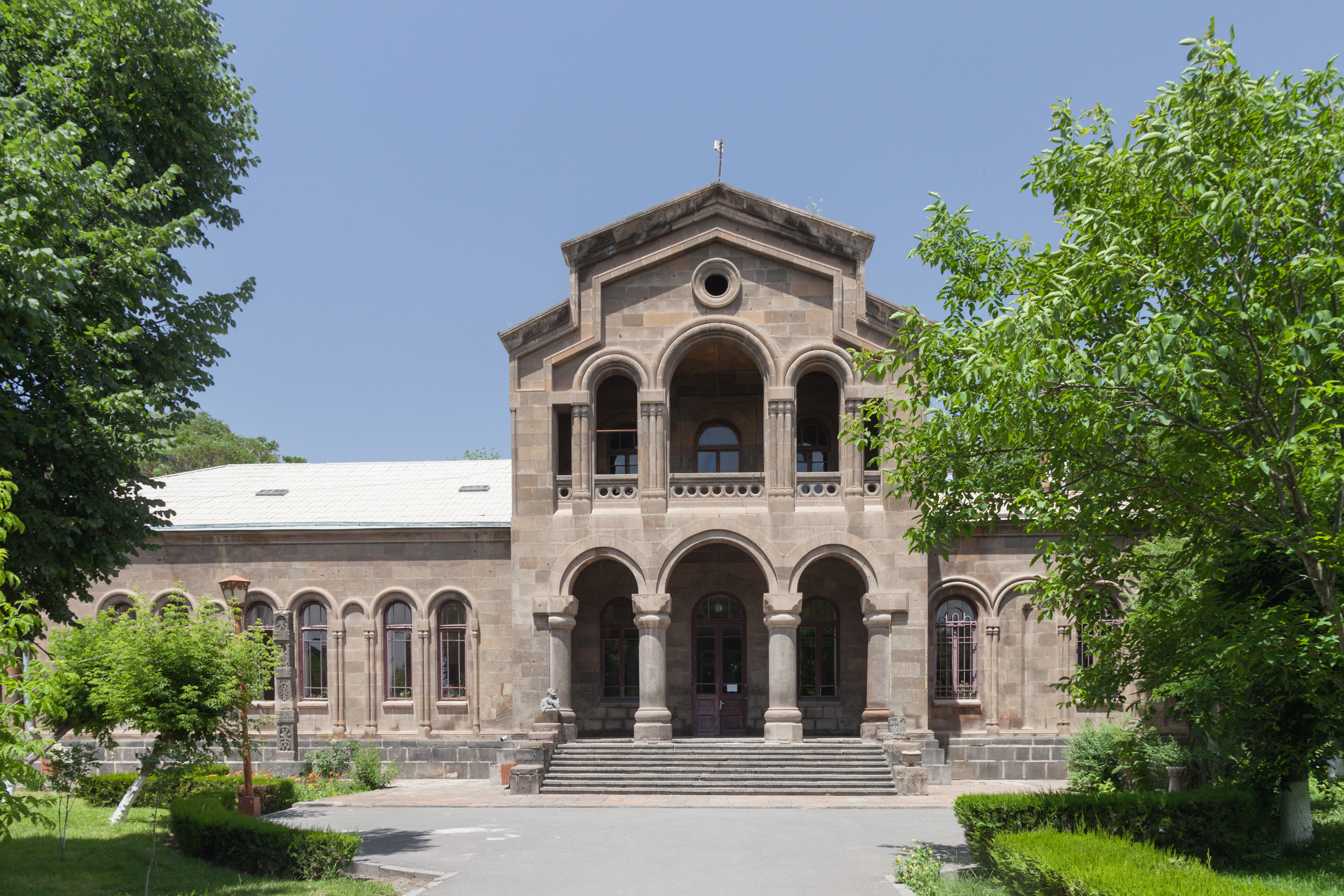
The manuscripts that later became the core of the Matenadaran collection were kept, before nationalization, at this building constructed in 1911 at the Etchmiadzin monastery.

The Matenadaran collection has its roots in the Etchmiadzin collection set up in 1441, when the Catholicosate returned from Sis in Cilicia. The Matenadaran at Etchmiadzin was pillaged several times, the last of which took place in 1804, during the Russo-Persian War. Eastern Armenia's annexation by the Russian Empire in the early 19th century provided a more stable climate for the preservation of the remaining manuscripts. Whereas in 1828 the curators of the Matenadaran catalogued a collection of only 1,809 manuscripts, in 1863 the collection had increased to 2,340 manuscripts, and in 1892 to 3,158 manuscripts. Prior to World War I, in 1913, the collection had reached 4,660 manuscripts. In 1915, the collection was sent to Moscow for safekeeping since Etchmiadzin was close to the war zone.

Thousands of Armenian manuscripts were destroyed during the Armenian Genocide in the Ottoman Empire, but around 1,600 were saved from Vaspurakan (Lim, Ktuts, Varag), Taron (Surb Karapet Monastery), Erzurum (Sanasarian College), and elsewhere.

=== Modern Matenadaran ===
On December 17, 1920, just two weeks after the demise of the First Republic of Armenia and Sovietization of Armenia, the new Bolshevik government of Armenia issued a decree nationalizing all cultural and educational institutions in Armenia. The decree, signed by Minister of Education Ashot Hovhannisyan, declared the manuscript repository of Etchmiadzin the "property of the working peoples of Armenia." It was put under the supervision of Levon Lisitsian, an art historian and the newly appointed commissar of all cultural and educational institutions of Etchmiadzin. On February 5, 1921 it became the basis of the newly-founded Etchmiadzin Cultural-Historical Institute (later renmated the Etchmiadzin Scientific Institute), Armenia's first research institute. In March 1922 the manuscripts from Etchmiadzin that had been sent to Moscow during World War I were ordered to be returned to Armenia by Alexander Miasnikian. 1,730 manuscripts were added to the original 4,660 manuscripts held at Etchmiadzin once they returned to Armenia.

In 1939 the entire collection of manuscripts of Etchmiadzin were transferred to the State Public Library in Yerevan (what later became the National Library of Armenia) by the decision of the Soviet Armenian government. In the same year there were 9,382 catalogued manuscripts at the Matenadaran.

On March 3, 1959, the Council of Ministers of Soviet Armenia officially established the Matenadaran as an "institute of scientific research with special departments of scientific preservation, study, translation and publication of manuscripts" in the current building. It was named after Mesrop Mashtots, the creator of the Armenian alphabet, in 1962. It had the distinction of being the first institute (and building) in the entire Soviet Union established for the study and preservation of manuscripts. During his 1970 visit to Armenia, speaking about the Matenadaran, Soviet leader Leonid Brezhnev declared that Sovietization "saved the ancient culture of the Armenian nation, the victory of socialism revived the spiritual life of this talented people, created the best conditions for its comprehensive flourishing."

A branch of the Matenadaran was established next to the monastery of Gandzasar in the Republic of Artsakh (Nagorno-Karabakh) in 2015. It contained copies of hundreds of manuscripts. It ceased operations following the Azerbaijani takeover and the forced exodus of Armenians in September 2023.

== Architecture ==
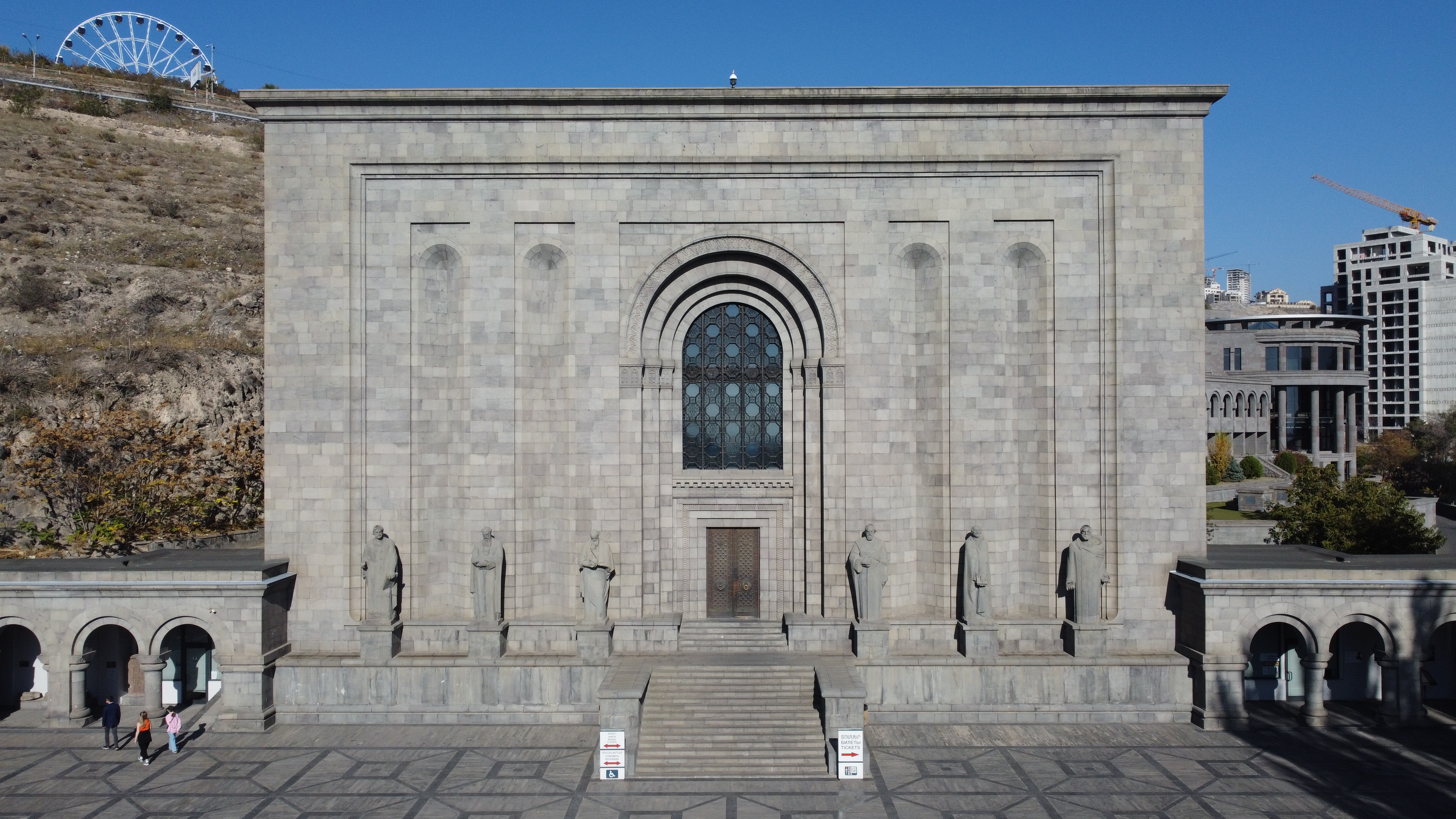
The main/old building of the Matenadaran

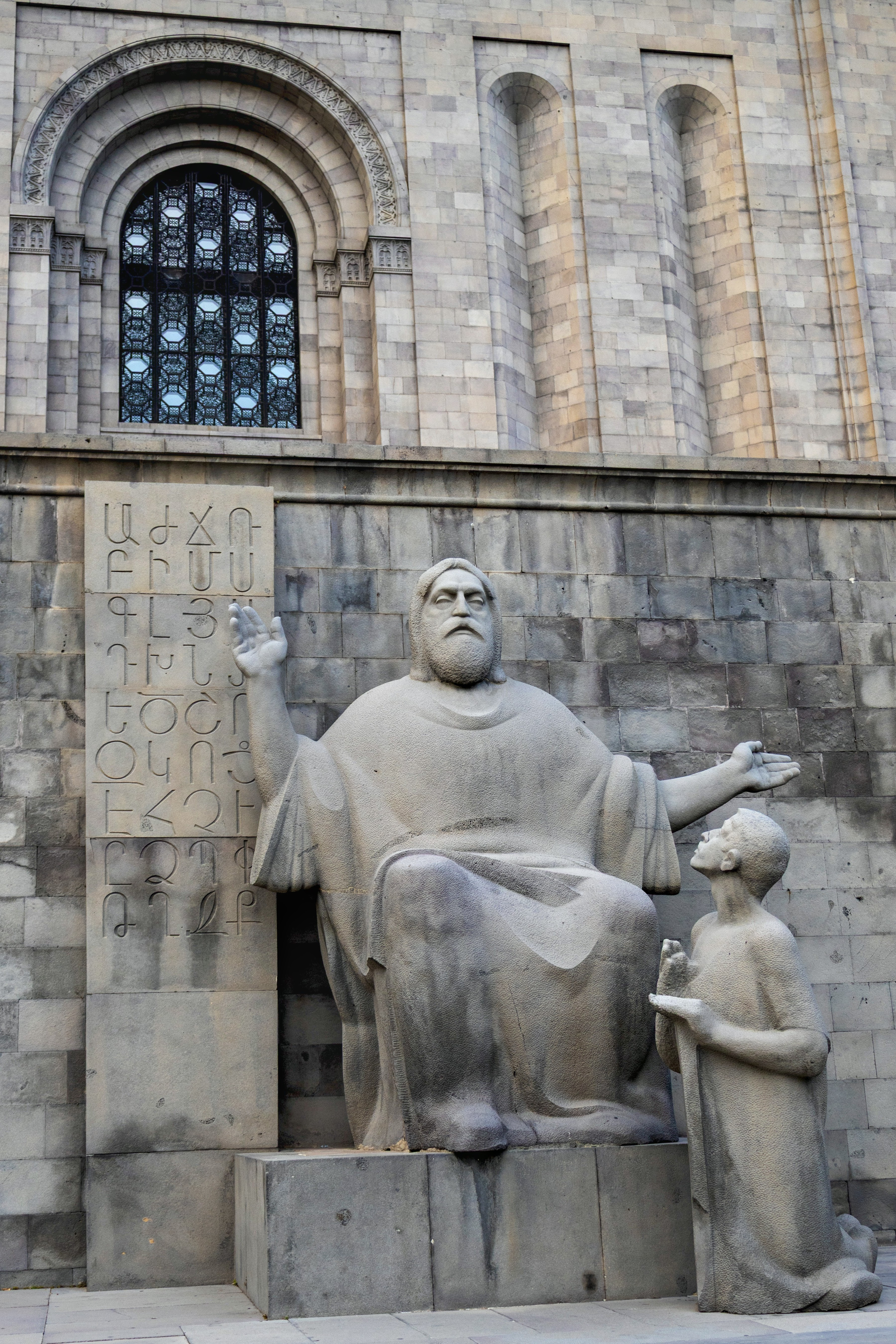
The statues of Mesrop Mashtots and his disciple Koryun by Ghukas Chubaryan (1962).

The architectural ensemble of the Matenadaran includes the main building, road leading up to the building, the wing colonnades, and monumental statues of prominent medieval Armenian figures. It is a national monument of Armenia.

=== Main building ===
The Matenadaran building is situated on a slope at the northeastern end of Mashtots Avenue, the main thoroughfare in central Yerevan. Rising 18 m (59 ft) above street level, it forms a visual endpoint for the avenue and serves as an intermediate link in the spatial composition that includes the statue of Mother Armenia and its large pedestal atop the hill.

Yerevan's chief architect Mark Grigorian was commissioned by the Soviet Armenian authorities to design it in October 1939, almost immediately after the manuscripts were decided to be transferred to Yerevan. Interrupted by the Great Patriotic War, he completed the design by November 1944, when his sketches were first publicly displayed. Despite accusations of nationalism, its design was endorsed by the Soviet Armenian leader Grigory Arutinov, while academician Hovsep Orbeli proposed its location. Its construction lasted from 1945 to 1957–58, with a pause from 1947 to 1953 due to a shortage of skilled laborers. Interior finishing was completed between 1957 and 1959. The building was most recently renovated in 2012.

Standing 22.4 m (73 ft) tall, it is a simple cube faced with local gray basalt. The design of its façade and interior are influenced by medieval Armenian architecture. Grigorian believed that the "attractive features of national architecture should be expressed in this building as vividly and strongly as possible." Its rectangular façade—a tall arched central entrance flanked by two tall and narrow decorative niches on both sides—is specifically inspired by the eastern façade of the 12th century southern gavit (narthex) of the Church of the Holy Apostles (Arakelots) of Ani, the grand capital of Bagratid Armenia. (Note: Grigorian chose not to incorporate the entrance's muqarnas, which he described as "somewhat Persian-style." Instead, he designed an "elegant main entrance that harmonizes with the national traditions of Armenian architecture.") Grigorian also cited the ancient Egyptian Temple of Edfu and the Baron's Palace in Ani as an inspiration—the former for the double triangular niches and the latter for the decorative frame. The niches have been also likened to those of Geghard and St. Hripsime.

The central archway features an arrangement of interlocking octagonal metal modules resembling medieval decorations found on the tympana of Yereruik and Saint Bartholomew Monastery. The design of the main entrance relies exclusively on basic geometric forms. The grand copper door, inspired by medieval church doors, is decorated with repeating motifs. (Note: One source claims it is a replica of the door of the Arakelots Monastery near Mush dated 1134.)

The entrance hall with the mural of the Battle of Avarayr

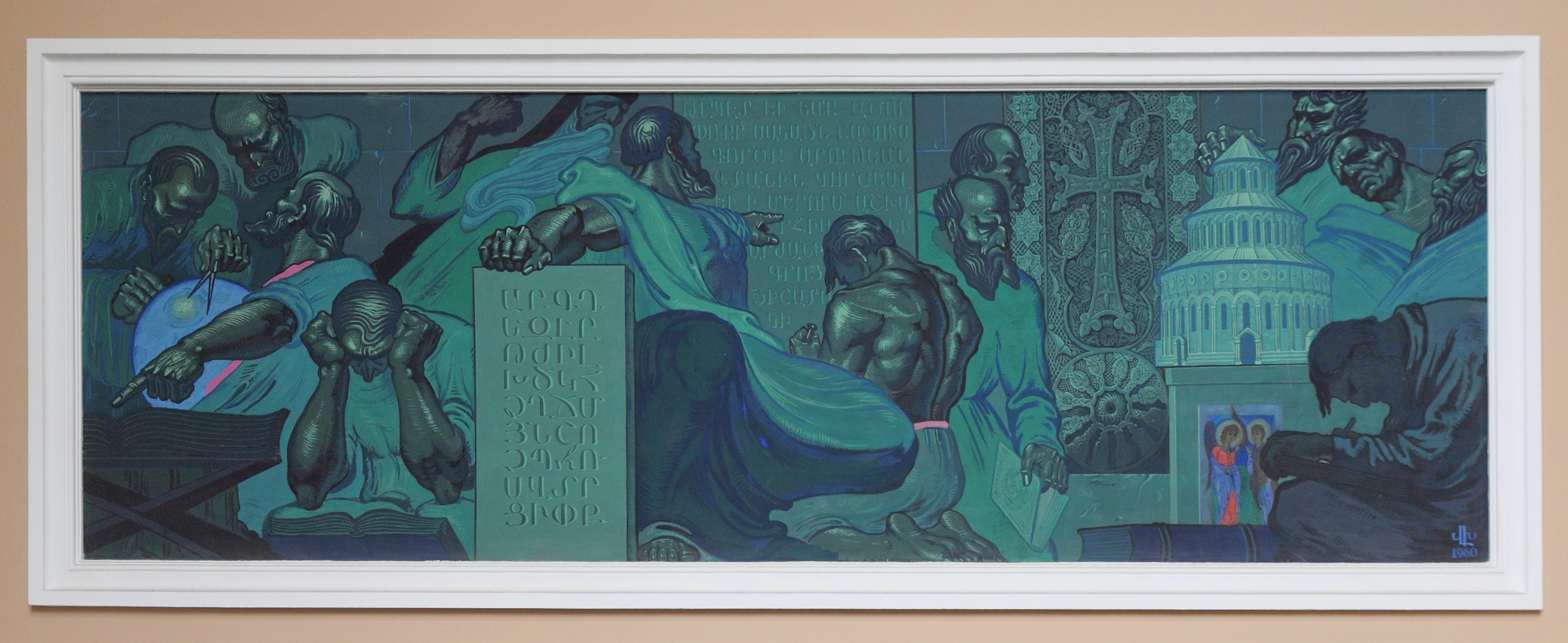
One of the three murals, depicting the Armenian alphabet, a quote from Movses Khorenatsi, a khachkar, a reconsutrction of Zvartnots Cathedral, and an illuminated manuscript.

==== Interiors ====
Its interior was likewise inspired by medieval Armenian architecture, especially eleventh and twelfth century gavits (zhamatuns). The vestibule was specifically inspired by the gavit of Sanahin Monastery, while other halls were inspired by the design of the gavits of Haghpat and Horomos. Various marbles were used in the interior, including brown marble in the lobby.

A triptych of vivid, Renaissance-inspired murals, created by Van Khachatur in 1959, depict three periods of Armenian history—Urartu, Hellenism, and the Christian Middle Ages—surrounding the steps leading to the main exhibition hall. A mosaic inspired by medieval Armenian art, also created by Khachatur in 1960, depicts the Battle of Avarayr (451) and is located in the entrance hall. Created from blue, black, red, orange, and yellow tesserae, it is fitted into the semicircular surface of an arch. Other artwork inside include a bronze sculpture of Movses Khorenatsi by Aytsemnik Urartu (1961), forty ceramic works and two sculptures by Hmayak Bdeyan. A large ivory medallion with a diameter of 2 m (6 ft 7 in) with the portrait of Vladimir Lenin by Sergey Merkurov was previously hung in the lecture hall.

==== Reception ====
The design of the building has generated a range of responses, reflecting both admiration and criticism. Hovhannes Margaryan praised its "outstanding conceptual and artistic quality", but Rafayel Israyelian, writing in 1953, observed that it faced "heavily criticism" during its design debates, pointing to "fundamental errors" in its location and style. For allowing "excesses" in its design, Grigorian was issued a severe reprimand by the Communist Party in 1956. Edmond Tigranyan saw its design as reflective of "Leninist understanding of cultural heritage and the objectives of national imagery in architecture" as expressed in the works of Alexander Tamanian.

Artsvin Grigoryan and Martin Tovmasyan commended the façade's "refined plasticity", noting how "classical variations in forms and proportions" create a "harmonious rhythm in the otherwise solid stone wall." They were, however, critical of what they described as "the deliberate archaization of the interior forms." They also found the "unsuccessful harmony between the building's volume and the slope, with its diagonal alignment seemingly cutting into the natural environment, disappointing."

Varazdat Harutyunyan suggested that Grigorian borrowed from Armenian architecture traditions "somewhat mechanically," adapting forms from medieval Armenian monuments "almost without alteration." Yuri Yaralov was even more critical, describing the building as "an example of an uncritical use of ancient forms in a modern structure" and calling it "a regrettable failure." According to Yaralov, Grigorian's near-direct replication of elements from 11th-13th century Armenian refectories and gavits transformed the building's interior into "a museum of historical forms, detaching visitors from the present and recreating the atmosphere of a distant medieval period."

In contrast to the critiques from architectural specialists, a range of lay opinions have expressed admiration for the building. Lionel Daiches found it "noble in design" and endowed with "great architectural dignity." A decade after its completion, Andrei Bitov described it as the most remarkable piece of modern Armenian architecture. Herbert Lottman called it solemn and solid-looking, while Levon Abrahamian characterized it as "orderly" and "imposing". Vartan Gregorian suggested that it is "perhaps by design, the most imposing building in Yerevan." Rouben Paul Adalian suggested that it was "designed as a modern temple to Armenian civilization." Several authors have likened its appearance that of a temple or a church, (Note: Michael J. Arlen: "a large and churchlike building", Max Mohl: "resembles a church, a solemn temple", Erich Richter: "resembling a temple from the outside".) while others have drawn parallels to a palace, especially in its style and proportions. (Note: Visitors have described it monumental, grandiose, austere, stern, and imposing.)

==== Statues ====
The statue of Mesrop Mashtots and his disciple Koryun by Ghukas Chubaryan was erected in 1962 (first in gypsum, then in basalt in 1967) below the terrace where the main building stands. James R. Russell compared the tablet on which the alphabet is written to that of Moses.

From 1963 to 1967, full-body basalt statues of six medieval Armenian scholars, Toros Roslin, Grigor Tatevatsi, Anania Shirakatsi, Movses Khorenatsi, Mkhitar Gosh, and Frik, were erected in front of the building. They represent manuscript illumination, philosophy, cosmology, history, jurisprudence, and poetry, respectively. The sculptors used a conventionalized image as their basis and aimed for stylistic unity. Giusto Traina found the statues imposing, although noting that one would expect scholars less muscular and more frail. The statues were restored and reinforced in 2025 after years of decay and cracked foundations caused by elemental exposure.

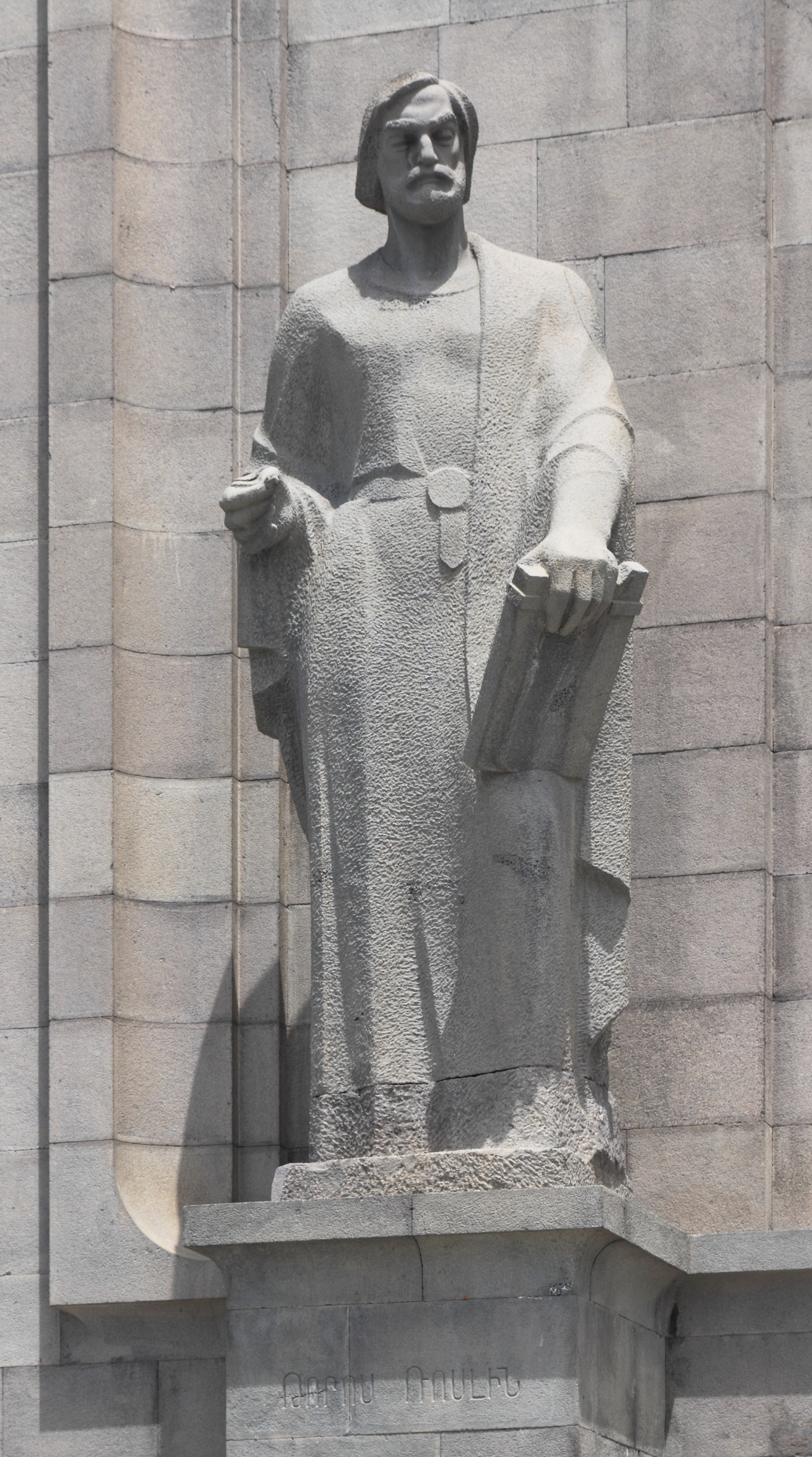
Toros Roslin
(Arsham Shahinyan, 1967)

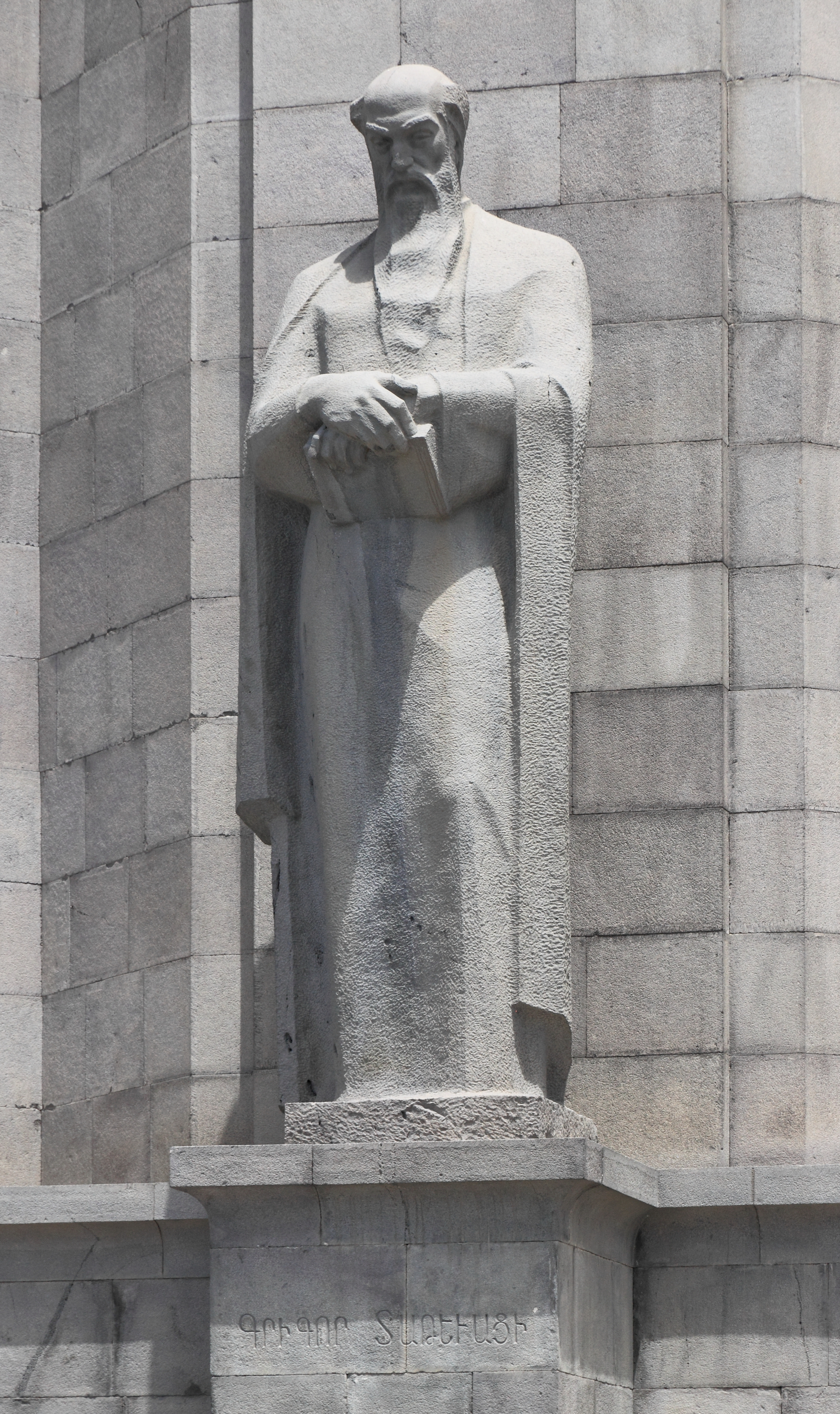
Grigor Tatevatsi
(Adibek Grigoryan, 1967)

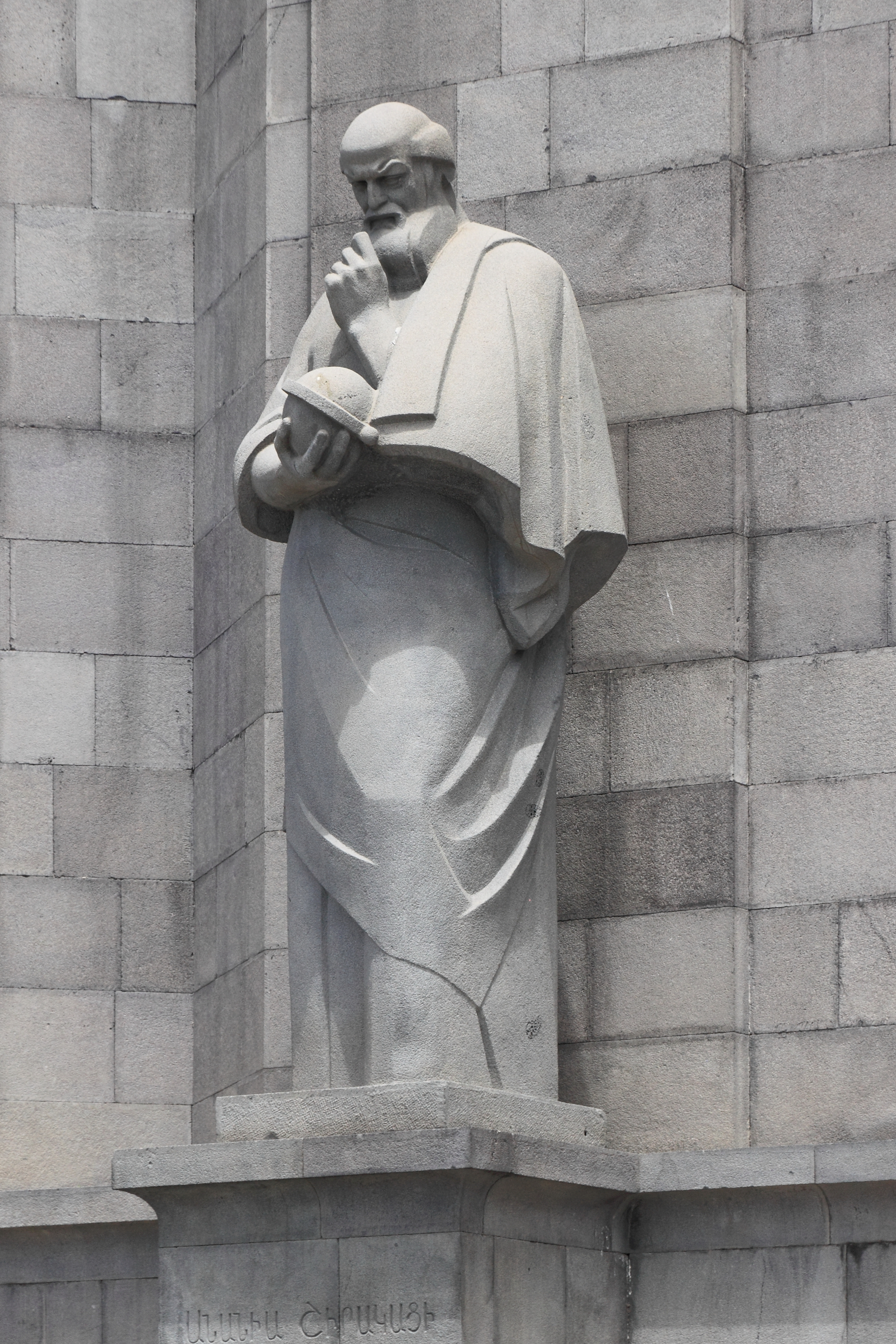
Anania Shirakatsi
(Grigor Badalyan, 1963)

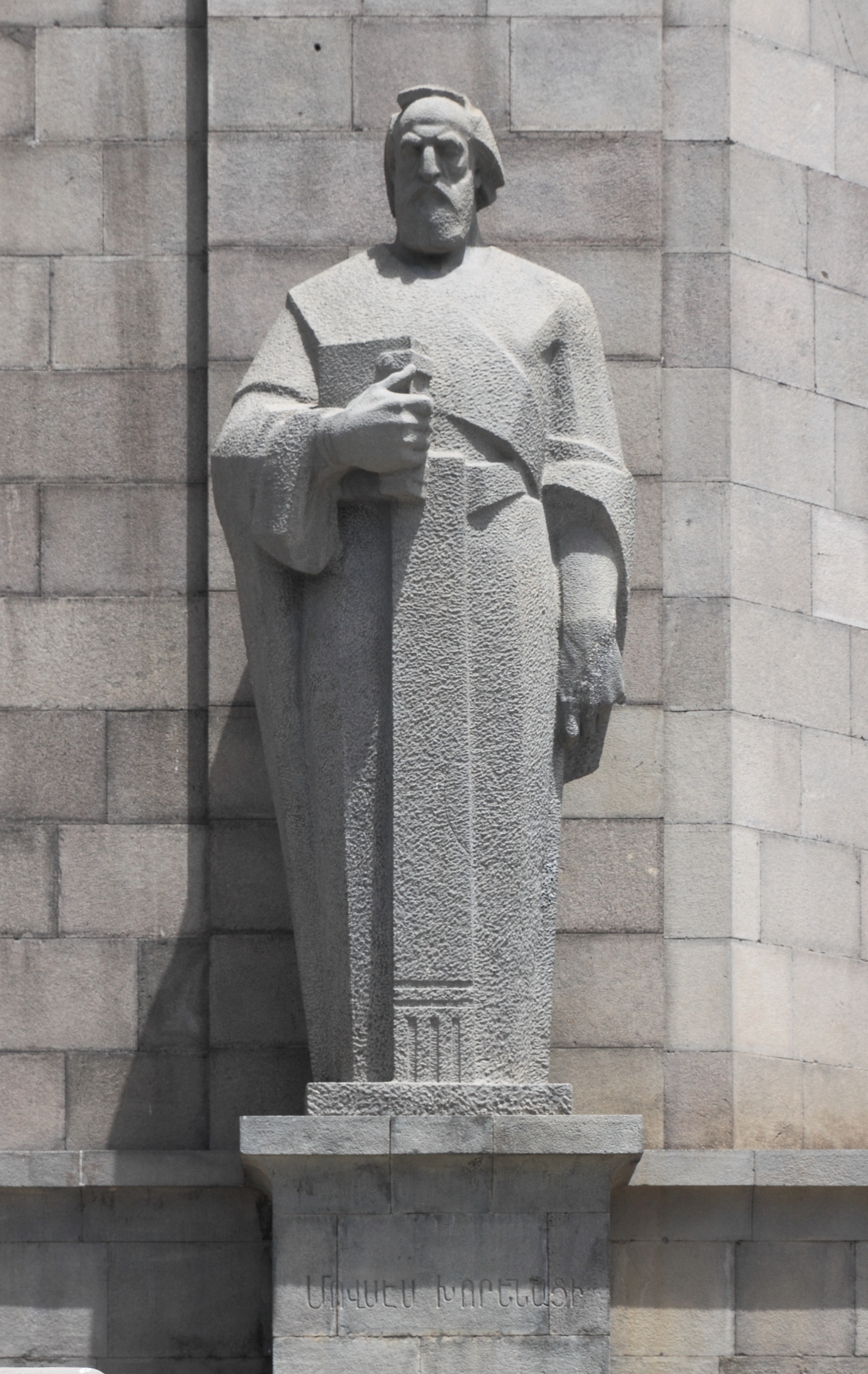
Movses Khorenatsi
(Yerem Vardanyan, 1964)

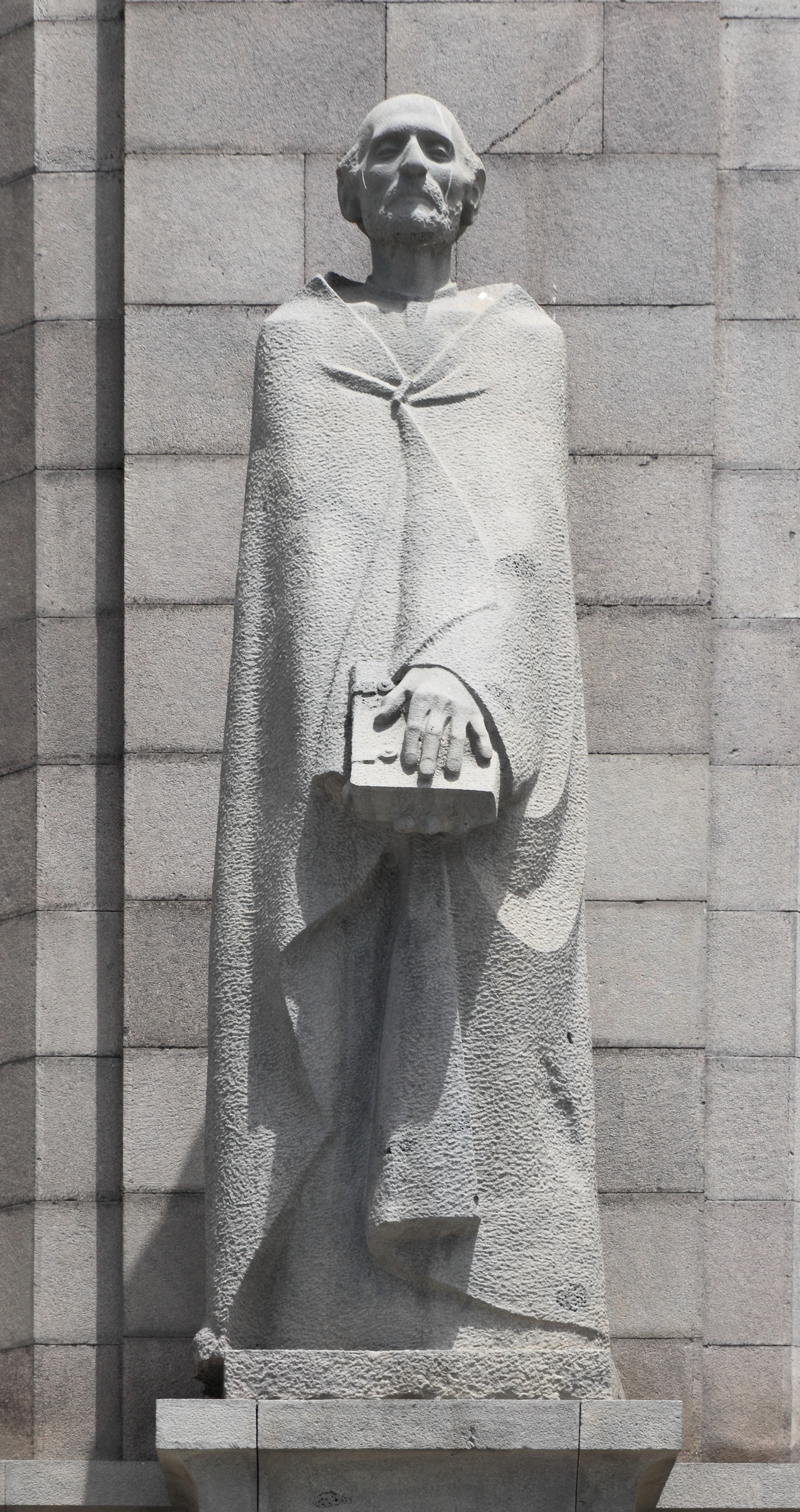
Mkhitar Gosh
(Ghukas Chubaryan, 1967)

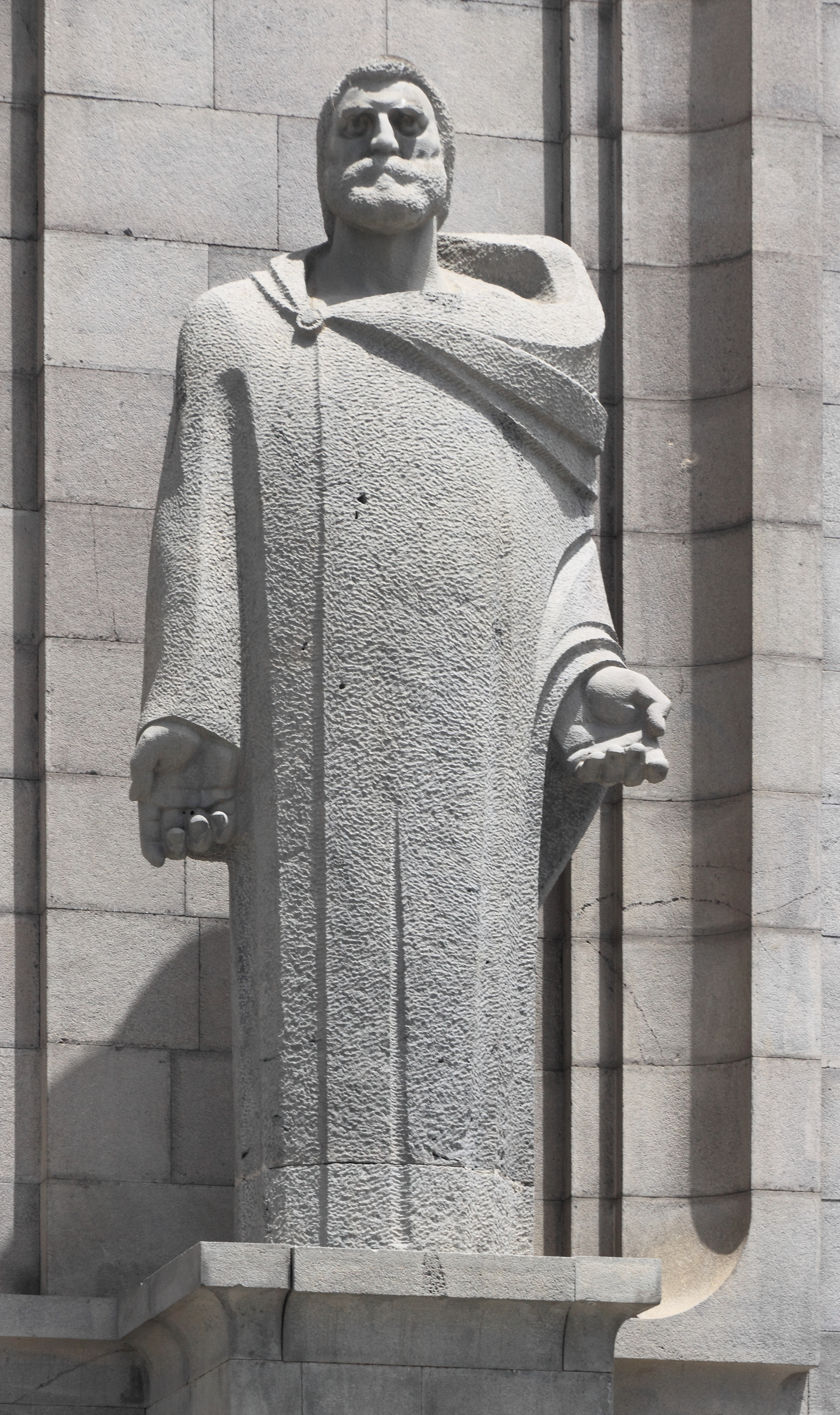
Frik
(Suren Nazaryan, 1967)

Since the 1970s an open-air exhibition is located in the colonnades on both sides of the entrance. On display there are four medieval khachkars; a 17th-century tombstone from the Noratus cemetery; a vishapakar dated 2nd-1st millennia BC; an 8th-century BC door from Teishebaini (Karmir Blur), a Urartian archaeological site.

=== New building ===
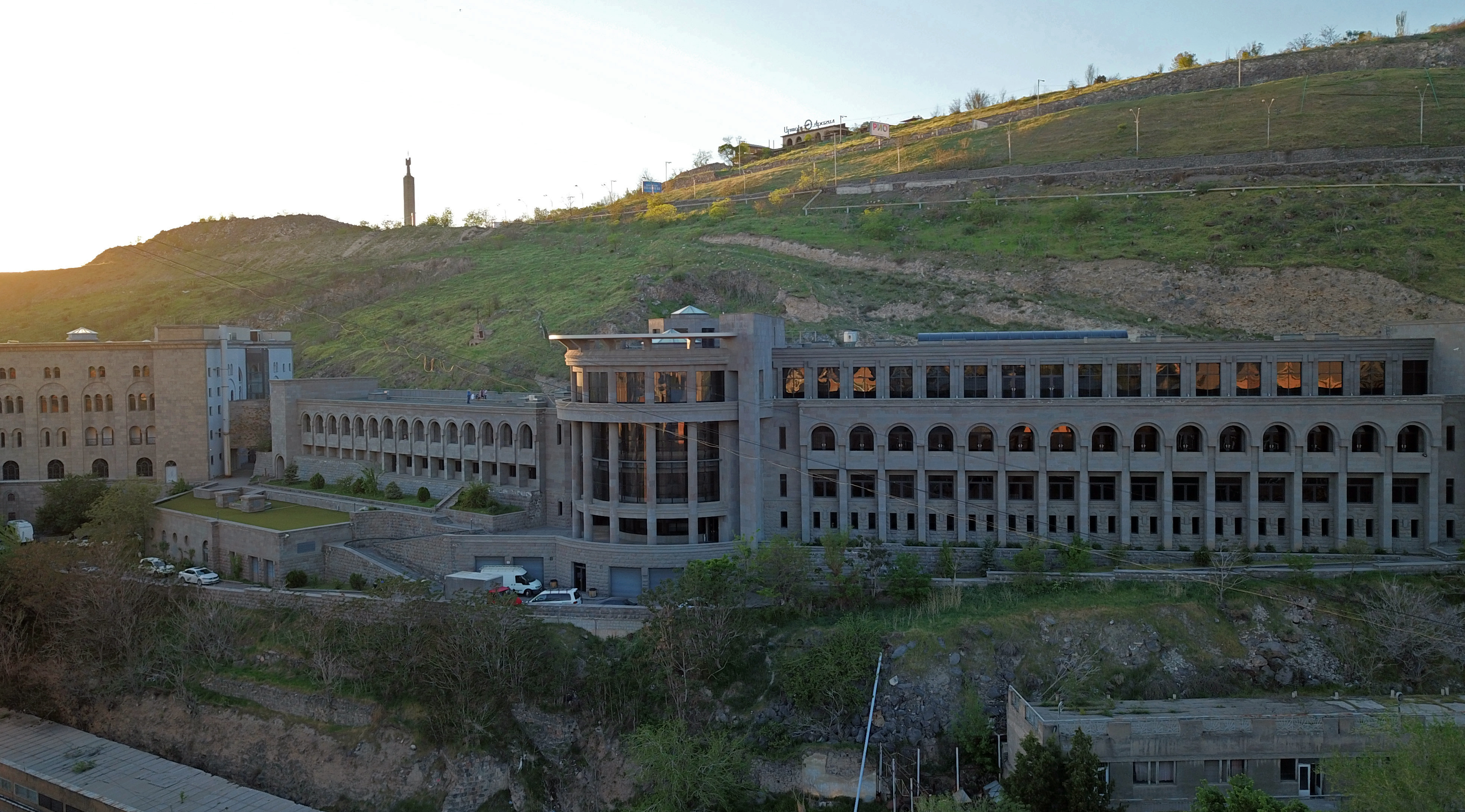
The new building of the Matenadaran.

The new building of the Matenadaran was designed by Arthur Meschian, an architect better known as a musician, to accommodate the growing collection of manuscripts. Its construction began in 1987, but was halted the next year because of the 1988 Armenian earthquake, the First Nagorno-Karabakh War and the post-Soviet economic crisis that ensued.

The idea was revived in 2008. Its foundation stone was laid in a ceremony attended by President Serzh Sargsyan and officiated by Catholicos Karekin II on May 14, 2009. It received funding from Moscow-based Armenian businessman Sergei Hambartsumian ($10 million) and Maxim Hakobian, director of the Zangezur Copper and Molybdenum Combine ($4 million), and was inaugurated on September 20, 2011, on the eve of celebrations of the 20th anniversary of Armenia's independence in attendance of President Serzh Sargsyan, Catholicoi Karekin II of Etchmiadzin and Aram I of Cilicia, Artsakh President Bako Sahakyan, and others.

This five-story structure surpasses the size of its predecessor, providing three times the space with 12,000 m^{2} (130,000 sq ft). One of its features is a state-of-the-art laboratory, dedicated to the preservation, restoration, and digitization of the manuscripts. Meschian's design seamlessly extends the legacy of the old structure without overshadowing it. Like Grigoryan, he incorporated traditional Armenian architecture into its design.

== Museum ==
The Matenadaran has become a Yerevan landmark and a major tourist attraction since its establishment. It has been described as Armenia's most important museum, and Yerevan's most important and most popular tourist attraction. It has maintained a good reputation, being described as a "world-class museum" by American diplomat John Brady Kiesling and "legendary" by Aleksey Levykin, director of Russia's State Historical Museum. Soviet librarian Yuri Grikhanov called it "perhaps the most unique manuscript repository in the world", while Tadevos Hakobyan compared its essence to that of the Library of Alexandria, noting that both served not only as book repositories but also as museums and centers of science. In 1989, the Communist Party's official newspaper, Pravda ranked it on par with Moscow's Tretyakov Gallery and the Leningrad Hermitage.

Since its establishment, the Matenadaran has attracted a large number of visitors. By the mid-1970s, 40,000 to 50,000 visited the museum annually. In the three yeard period from 1977 to 1979, the museum received 160,000 visitors, including 110,000 Soviet citizens and 50,000 foreigners. It attracted some 89,000 visitors in 2016, and around 132,600 in 2019. Many dignitaries have visited the Matenadaran, including Leonid Brezhnev (1970), Indira Gandhi (1976), Ilia II of Georgia (1978), Vladimir Putin (2001), Prince Charles (2013), Emmanuel Macron (2026), António Guterres (2026). (Note: Including, among others, presidents Boris Tadić of Serbia, Sergio Mattarella of Italy, Bronisław Komorowski of Poland, Heinz Fischer of Austria, Valdis Zatlers of Latvia, Rumen Radev of Bulgaria, Prokopis Pavlopoulos of Greece.)

== Collection ==
Currently, the Matenadaran contains a total of some 23,000 manuscripts and scrolls—including fragments. It is, by far, the single largest collection of Armenian manuscripts in the world. Furthermore, over 500,000 documents, including those of catholicoi and periodicals. The manuscripts cover a wide array of subjects: religious and theological works (Gospels, Bibles, lectionaries, psalters, hymnals, homilies, and liturgical books), texts on history, mathematics, geography, astronomy, cosmology, philosophy, jurisprudence, medicine, alchemy, astrology, music, grammar, rhetoric, philology, pedagogy, collections of poetry, literary texts, and translations from Greek and Syriac. The writings of classical and medieval historians Movses Khorenatsi, Yeghishe and Koryun are preserved here, as are the legal, philosophical and theological writings of other notable Armenian figures. The preserved writings of Grigor Narekatsi and Nerses Shnorhali at the Matenadaran form the cornerstone of medieval Armenian literature.

The manuscripts previously held at Etchmiadzin constitute the core of the Matenadaran collection. The rest came from the Lazarev Institute of Oriental Languages in Moscow, the Nersisian Seminary and the Armenian Ethnographic Society, both in Tbilisi, and the Yerevan Museum of Literature.

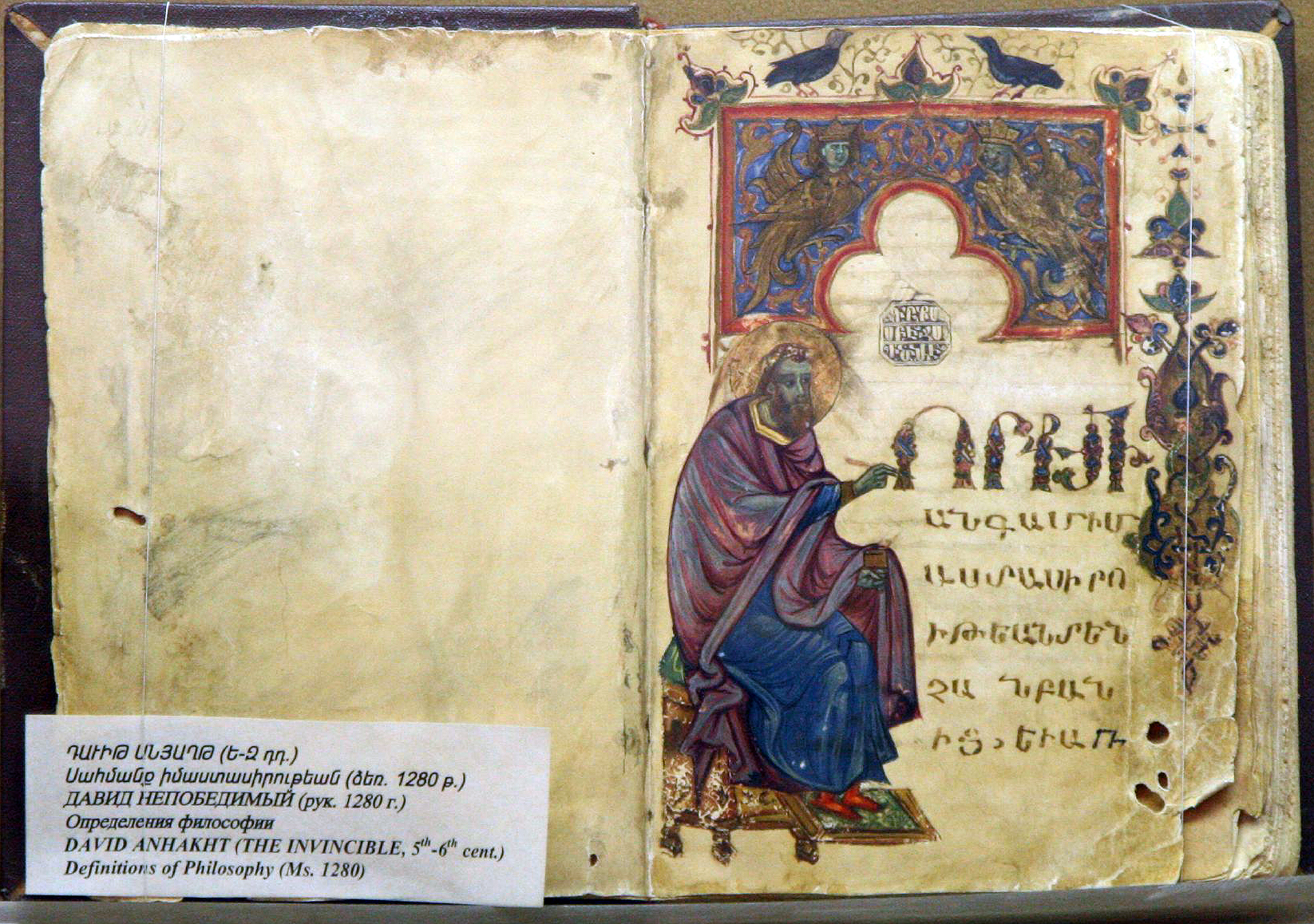
Definitions of Philosophy of David the Invincible (13th century)

When it was established as a distinct institution in 1959, the Matenadaran had around 10,000 Armenian manuscripts and 4,000 fragments (partial volumes or isolated pages) dating as early as the 5th century. At the time there were some one thousand manuscripts in other languages, such as Persian, Syriac, Arabic, Greek, Georgian, Russian, Hebrew, Hindi, Tamil, Latin, Ethiopic (Geʽez), and other languages. Some originals, written in other languages, have been saved only in their Armenian translations.

There has been steady growth in the number of manuscripts preserved at the Matenadaran, mostly from gifts from private individuals from the Armenian diaspora. In 1972 there were already 12,960 Armenian manuscripts and nearly two thousand manuscripts in other languages. Among the major donors of the Matenadaran include Harutiun Hazarian from New York (397 manuscripts), Varouzhan Salatian from Damascus (150 manuscripts), Rafael Markossian from Paris (37 manuscripts). Rouben Galichian from London has donated old maps. In 1969 Tachat Markossian, 95, from the village of Gharghan, near Isfahan, in central Iran, donated a 1069 manuscript to the Matenadaran. Written at Narekavank monastery, it is a copy of a Gospel written by Mashtots.

=== Notable manuscripts ===
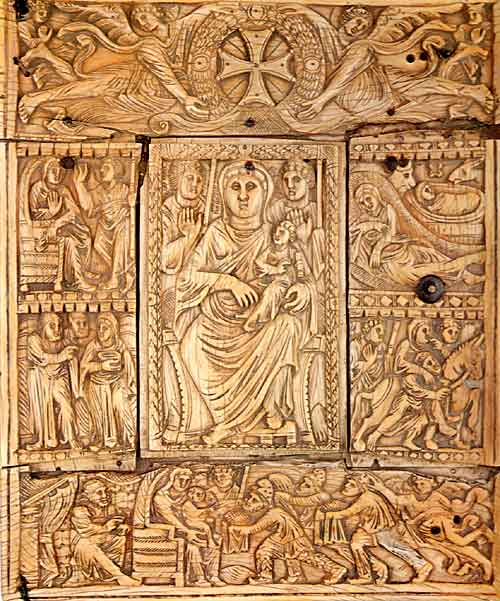
Carved ivory binding, front cover in five sections of Echmiadzin Gospel, Virgin and Child with scenes from her life, 6th century

Among the most significant manuscripts of the Matenadaran are the Lazarian Gospel (9th century), the Echmiadzin Gospel (10th century) and the Mughni Gospel (11th century). The first, so called because it was brought from the Lazarian Institute, is from 887 and is one of the Matenadaran's oldest complete volumes. The Echmiadzin Gospel, dated 989, has a 6th-century, probably Byzantine, carved ivory cover. The Cilician illuminated manuscripts by Toros Roslin (13th century) and Sargis Pitsak (14th century), two prominent masters, are also held with high esteem.

Three manuscripts are allowed to leave the Matenadaran on a regular basis. The first is the Vehamor Gospel, donated to the Matenadaran by Catholicos Vazgen I in 1975. It probably dates to the 7th century and is, thus, the oldest complete extant Armenian manuscript. The name refers to the mother of the Catholicos (vehamayr), to whose memory Vazgen I dedicated the manuscript. Since Levon Ter-Petrosyan in 1991, all president of Armenia have given their oath on this book. The other two, the Shurishkani Gospel (1498, Vaspurakan) and the Shukhonts' Gospel (1669) are taken to the churches of Mughni and Oshakan every year to be venerated.

=== Other items ===
Besides manuscripts, the Matenadaran holds a copy of the Urbatagirk, the first published Armenian book (1512, Venice) and all issues of the first Armenian magazine Azdarar ("Herald"), published in Madras, India from 1794 to 1796. The first map printed in Armenian—in Amsterdam in 1695—is also kept at the Matenadaran.

== Publications ==
=== Catalogs ===
The first complete catalog of the Matenadaran manuscripts («Ցուցակ ձեռագրաց») was published in two volumes in 1965 and 1970 with a supplementary volume in 2007. These three volumes listed 11,100 manuscripts kept at the Matenadaran with short descriptions. Since 1984, a more detailed catalog has been published, titled The Main List of Armenian Manuscripts («Մայր ցուցակ հայերէն ձեռագրաց»). As of 2019, ten volumes have been published.

=== Journals ===
==== Banber Matenadarani ====
The Matenadaran publishes the scholarly journal Banber Matenadarani (Բանբեր Մատենադարանի, "Herald of the Matenadaran", ISSN 1829-054X) since 1941. The first two volumes, published in 1941 and 1950, appeared under the title Collection of Scientific Materials (Գիտական նյութերի ժողովածու, Gitakan nyut‘eri zhoghovatsu) and acquired its current name in 1956. As of 2024, 37 volumes have been published. All are available online. The articles are usually devoted to the manuscripts and editions of texts contained in the collection, authored mainly by its researchers. It is well-regarded internationally. Nina Garsoïan called it important, Vartan Matiossian described it as "highly respected", and Robert H. Hewsen commended its high quality of scholarship.

==== Matenadaran: Medieval and Early Modern Armenian Studies (MEMAS) ====
Since 2024 Brepols publishes Matenadaran: Medieval and Early Modern Armenian Studies (MEMAS), a biannual peer-reviewed Open Access academic journal providing research on medieval and early modern history and culture, serving as a major scholarly outlet for Armenian studies.

== Significance and recognition ==
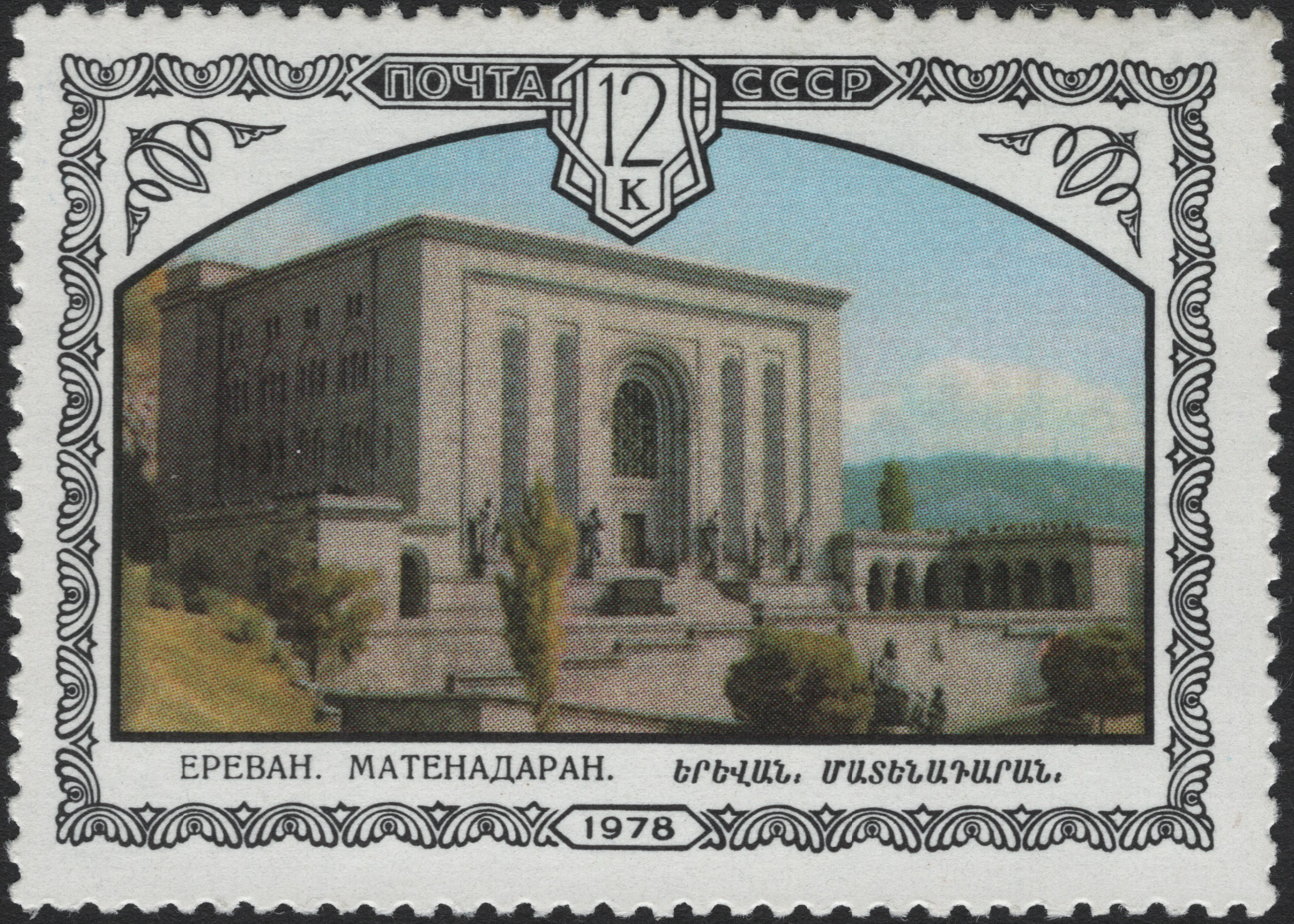
On a 1978 Soviet stamp

It is a "source of national pride" for Armenians, who view it as "a repository of national heritage." The Matenadaran collection was inscribed by the UNESCO into the Memory of the World Register in 1997. In 2011 Armenian President Serzh Sargsyan called the Matenadaran a "national treasure which has become the greatest citadel of the Armenian identity." In 2013 the Armenian government recognized the Matenadaran—along with the Byurakan Observatory and the Armenian Genocide Museum-Institute—as scientific institutions of "national value". Asoghik Karapetian, director of the Etchmiadzin Museums, called the Matenadaran one of the holiest sites of Armenian identity, along with Mount Ararat and Etchmiadzin.

According to Nora Dudwick, in the Soviet period, the Matenadaran "symbolized the central values of Armenian culture [and signified] to Armenians the high level of culture and learning their ancestors achieved as early as the fifth century." Thomas de Waal notes that alongside several other institutions (e.g. the Opera, National Gallery) the Matenadaran was central in the Soviet efforts to make Yerevan a "repository of Armenian myths and hopes." Levon Abrahamian argues that the secular Matenadaran continued the traditions of medieval monasteries within an atheist state.

Patrick Donabédian and Claude Mutafian characterized it as a "modern, secular, and urban monastery." Gevorg Emin called it the "chief temple" of Armenian manuscripts, while Silva Kaputikyan suggested that it "evokes the same reverent feeling" as Saint Hripsime Church and the monastery of Geghard. Abrahamian suggests that the Matenadaran has become a sanctuary and temple for Armenians, where manuscripts are treated not only with scientific respect, but also adoration. An American delegation headed by the noted chemist Glenn T. Seaborg that visited in 1971 noted the "loving care with which the people obviously regarded" the "tremendous wealth" of the Matenadaran. Karen Demirchyan, the Soviet Armenian leader, stressed that there was no longer a necessity to safeguard Armenian books and manuscripts from potential destruction through constant migrations, as they were safeguarded at the Matenadaran, which he called the "temple of priceless creations of the people's mind and talent."

== Tributes ==
In the Soviet era, it was featured on a 1978 stamp and a 5 ruble commemorative coin released in 1990.

In post-Soviet Armenia, it appeared on a 1,000 dram banknote circulated from 1994 to 2004. Additionally, it was depicted on uncirculated commemorative coins in 2002 (gold) and 2007 (silver), as well as on a stamp issued in 2007. In 2015 the Central Bank of Russia issued a silver commemorative coin dedicated to the Eurasian Economic Union, which depicted symbols of the capitals of the member states, including the Matenadaran. (Note: also the Grand Kremlin Palace and Spasskaya Tower in Moscow, the National Library of Belarus in Minsk, Kazakhstan's Presidential Palace in Astana, and the Kyrgyz State Historical Museum in Bishkek.)

== People ==
=== Directors ===
- Gevorg Abov (1940–1952)
- Vache Nalbandyan (1952–1954)
- Levon Khachikian (1954–1982)
- Sen Arevshatyan (1982–2007)
- Hrachya Tamrazyan (2007–2016)
- Vahan Ter-Ghevondyan (2018–2023)
- Arayik Khzmalyan (2023–)

=== Notable researchers ===
- Gevorg Emin, poet, essayist, and translator. He worked briefly at the Matenadaran in the 1940s.
- Rafael Ishkhanyan, linguist, political activist, and member of parliament. He worked at the Matenadaran from 1961 to 1963.
- Asatur Mnatsakanian, philologist and historian. He worked at the Matenadaran from 1940 until his death in 1983. A longtime chief bibliographer.
- Nouneh Sarkissian, First Lady of Armenia (2018–22), worked at the Matenadaran in the 1980s.
- Levon Ter-Petrosyan, first President of Armenia (1991–98), worked at the Matenadaran from 1978 to 1991, initially a junior researcher, then a senior researcher. He was also the Matenadaran's scientific secretary in 1978–85.
- Babken Chookaszian, philologist and orientalist, deputy director for science 1965–94
- Karen Yuzbashyan, historian
- Nikoghos Tahmizian, musicologist

== See also ==
- List of libraries in Armenia
