= Noratus =

Village in Gegharkunik, Armenia

Noratus Նորատուս
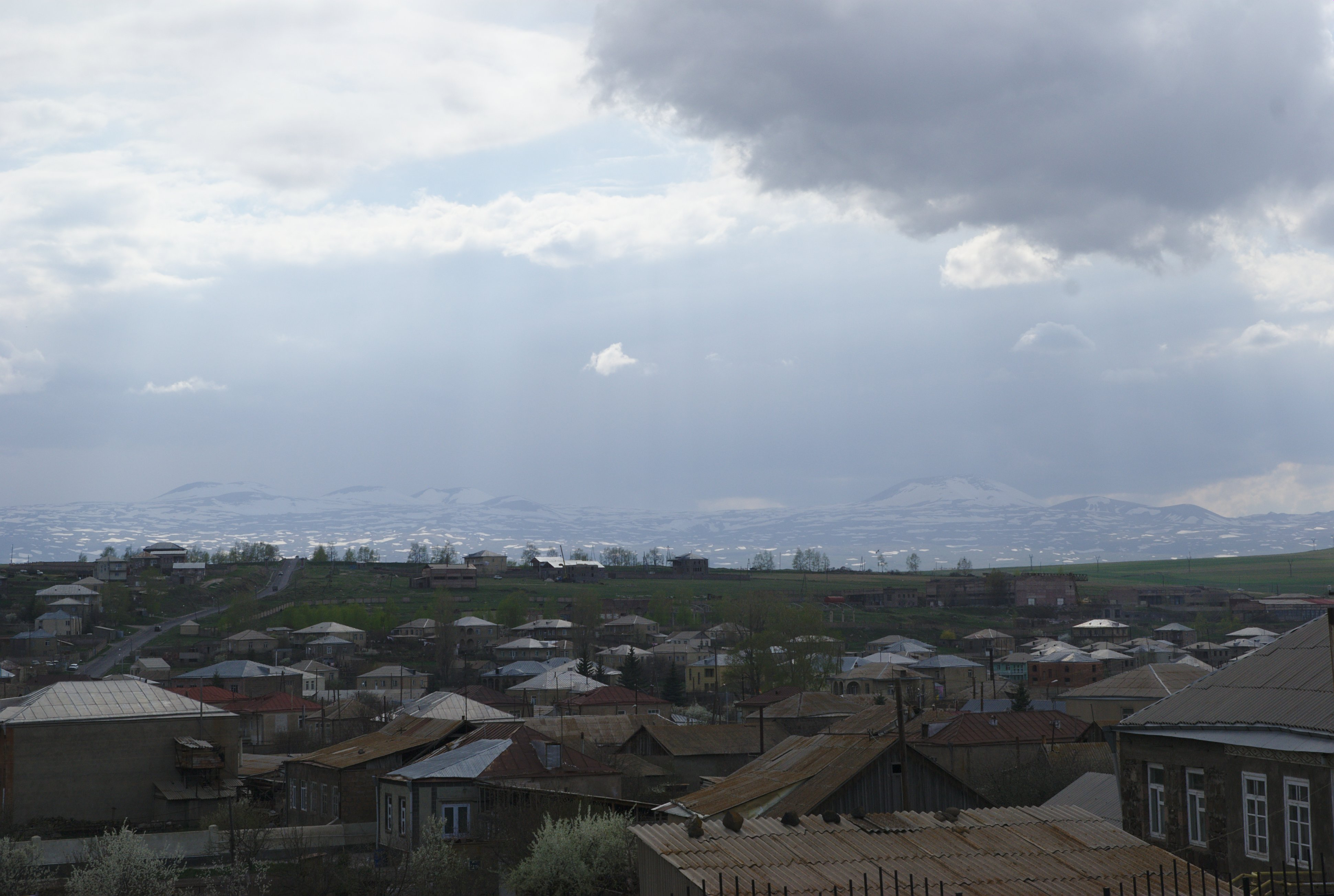
- A view of Noratus

- Location within Armenia Location within Gegharkunik
- Coordinates: 40°22′48″N 45°10′48″E
- Country: Armenia
- Province: Gegharkunik
- Municipality: Gavar

Government
  - Mayor: Murad Harutyunyan
- Elevation: 1,925 m (6,316 ft)

Population (2011)
  - Total: 6,732
- Time zone: UTC+4 (AMT)

Noratus (Armenian: Նորատուս) is a village in the Gavar Municipality of the Gegharkunik Province of Armenia, near the town of Gavar. The village has a rich historical past, and is famous for the Noratus cemetery, the largest surviving cemetery in the world featuring khachkars.

== History ==
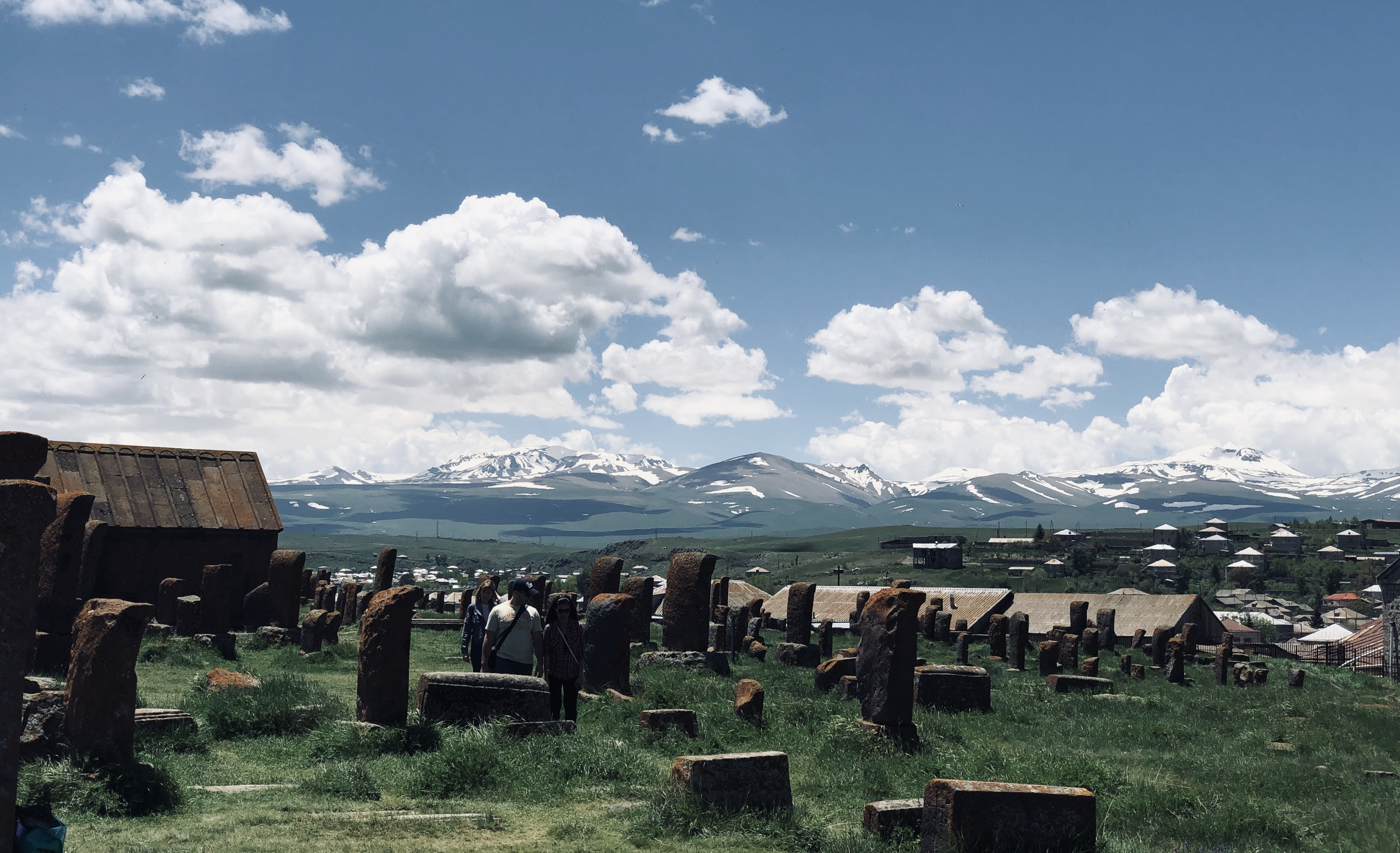
Khachkars in Noratus cemetery

Noratus is first mentioned as a settlement in the Middle Ages, when it was a much larger settlement. The bronze-age megalithic fort near the village points to the notion that Noratus is one of the most ancient continuously inhabited settlements in Armenia.

There are a great number of medieval monuments and records in the village and around it. One of the famous churches in Noratus is St. Astvatsatsin Church, which is located in the middle of the village. It was built in the late of 9th century by the Gegharkunik prince Sahak. The church was a domed hall, completely built from polished and large stones. It was foundered in the last centuries and as traditionally it is said, the dome and roof were destroyed by the Lezgins. Alashkert immigrants have covered it with timbers. The church had a fenced yard, where now there are many khachkars (Armenian cross-stone) and headstones. The most ancient record is on one of the khachkars, which is now kept in the State Museum of Armenian History.

== Gavar transmitter ==
Northeast of Noratus, there is the Gavar transmitter, a huge Soviet-type facility for longwave, mediumwave and shortwave radio broadcasting.

== Gallery ==
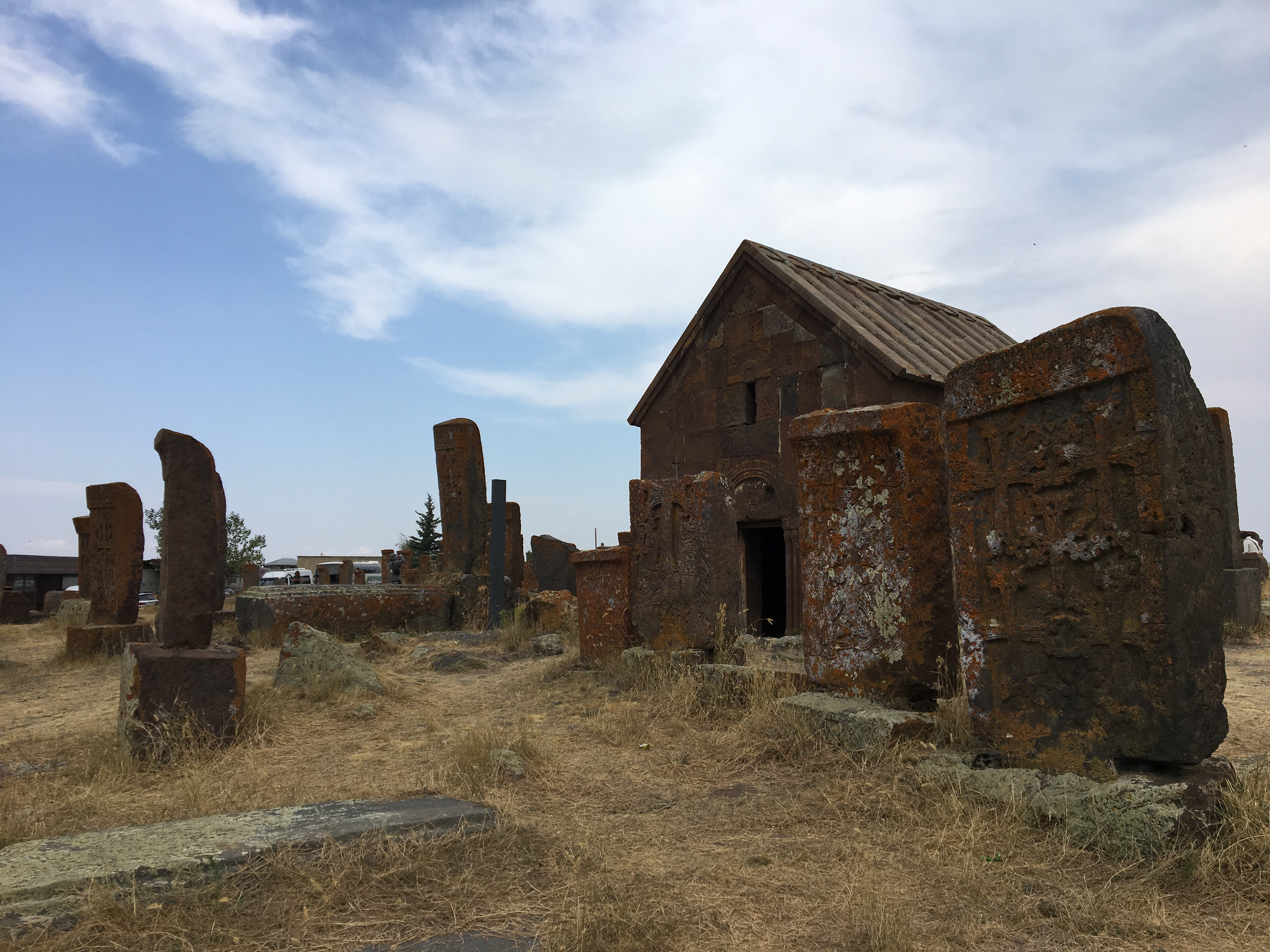
Chapel located within the cemetery

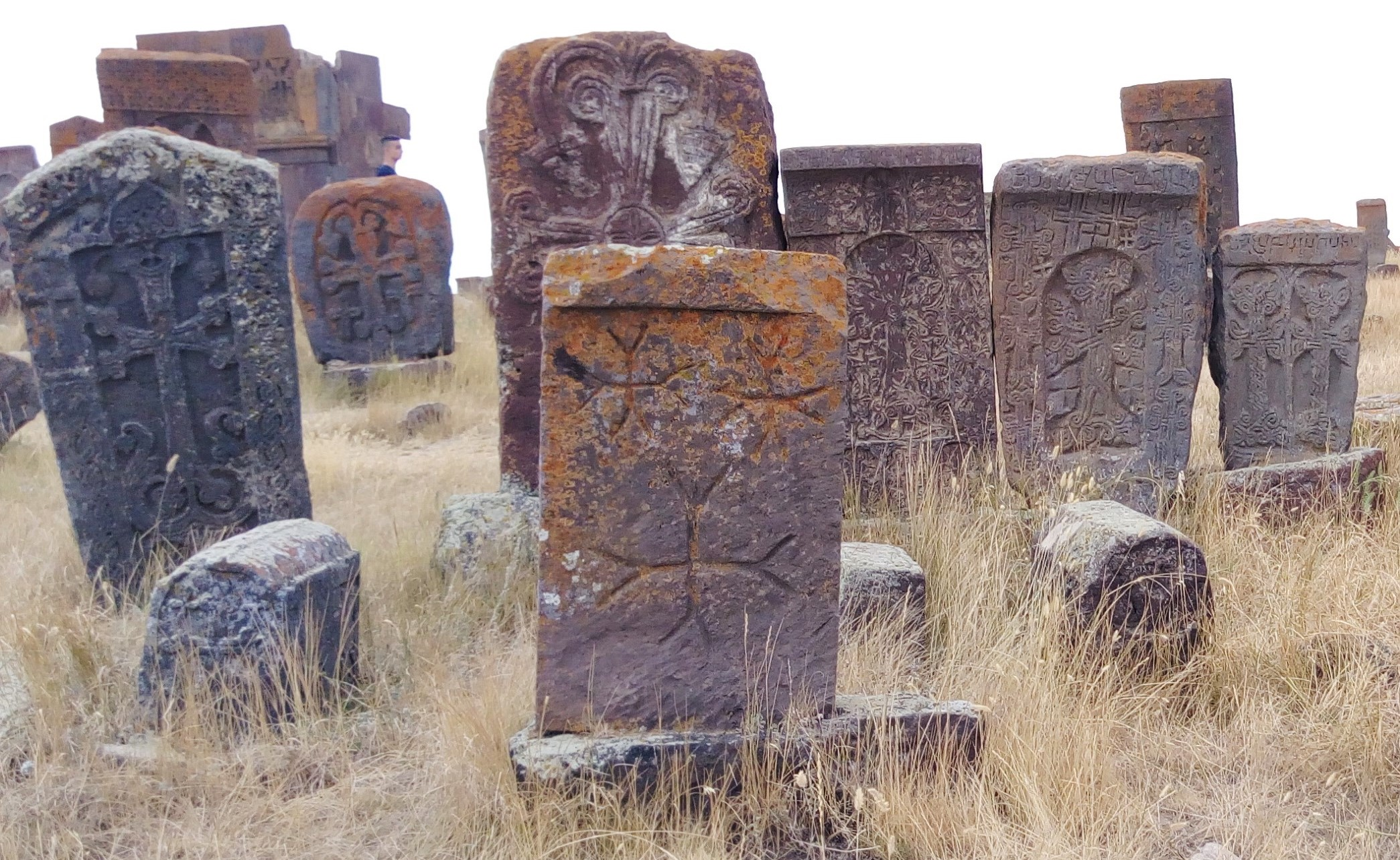
Khachkars in Noratus cemetery

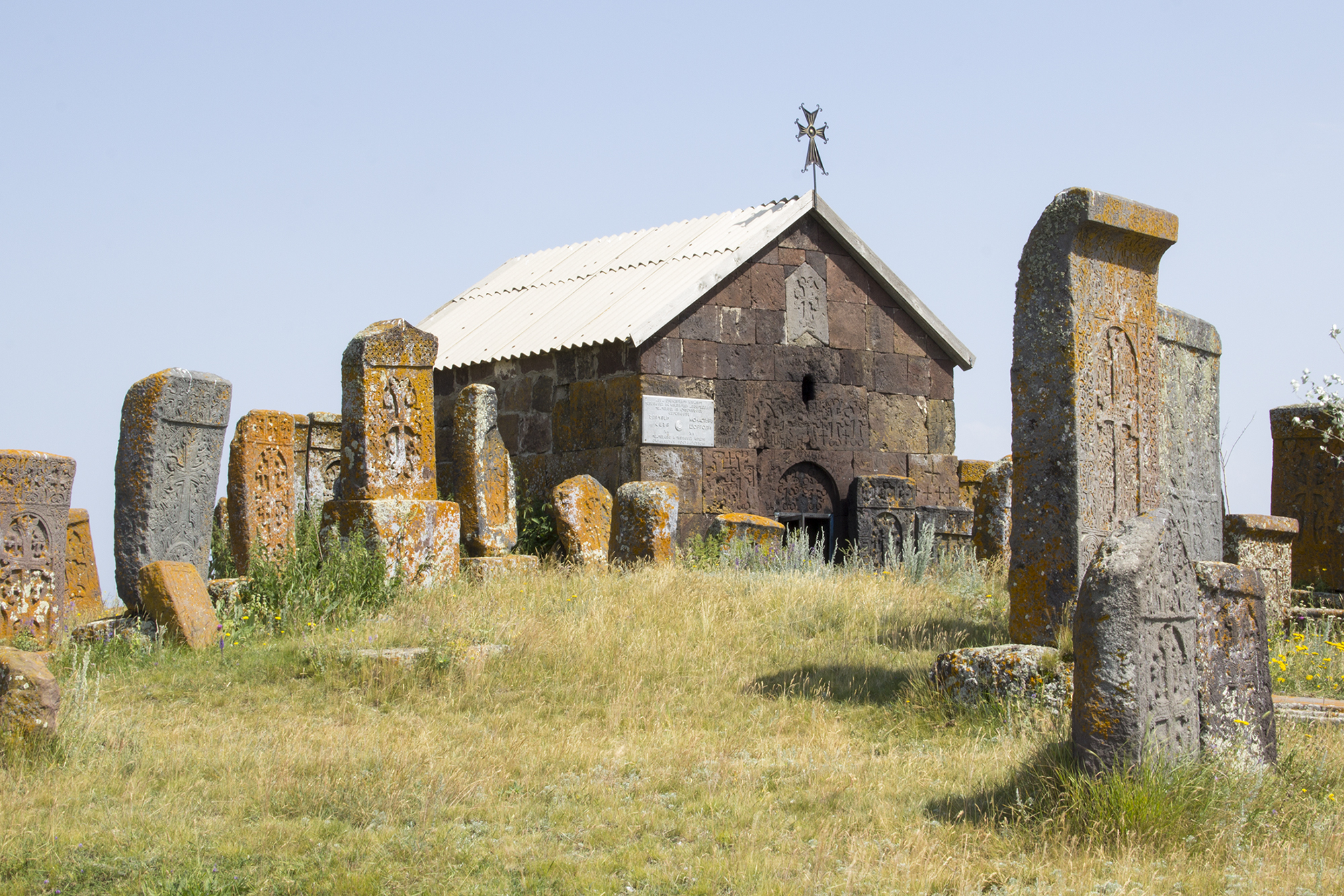
Shorgyoli Vank

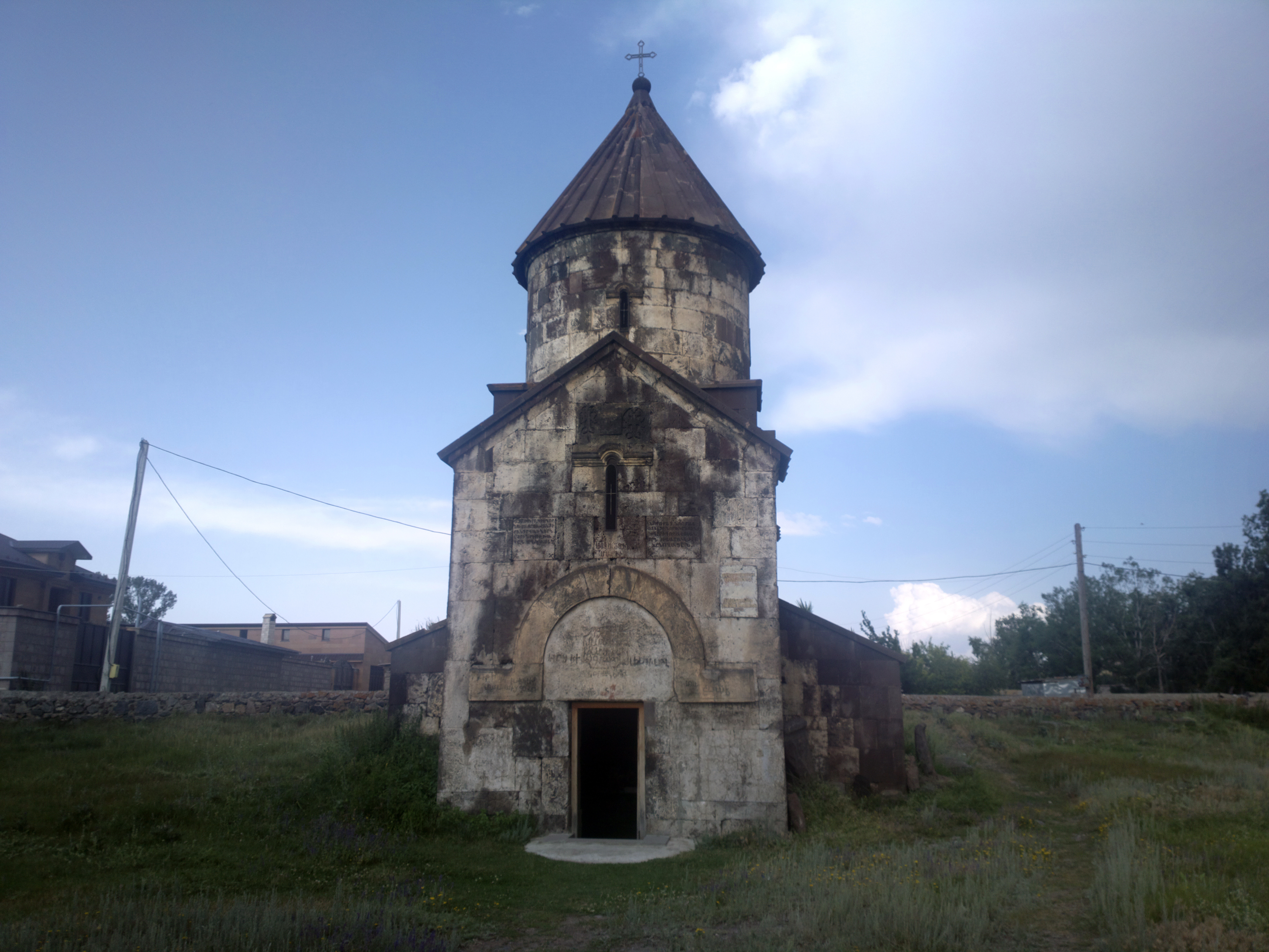
Doputs Vank

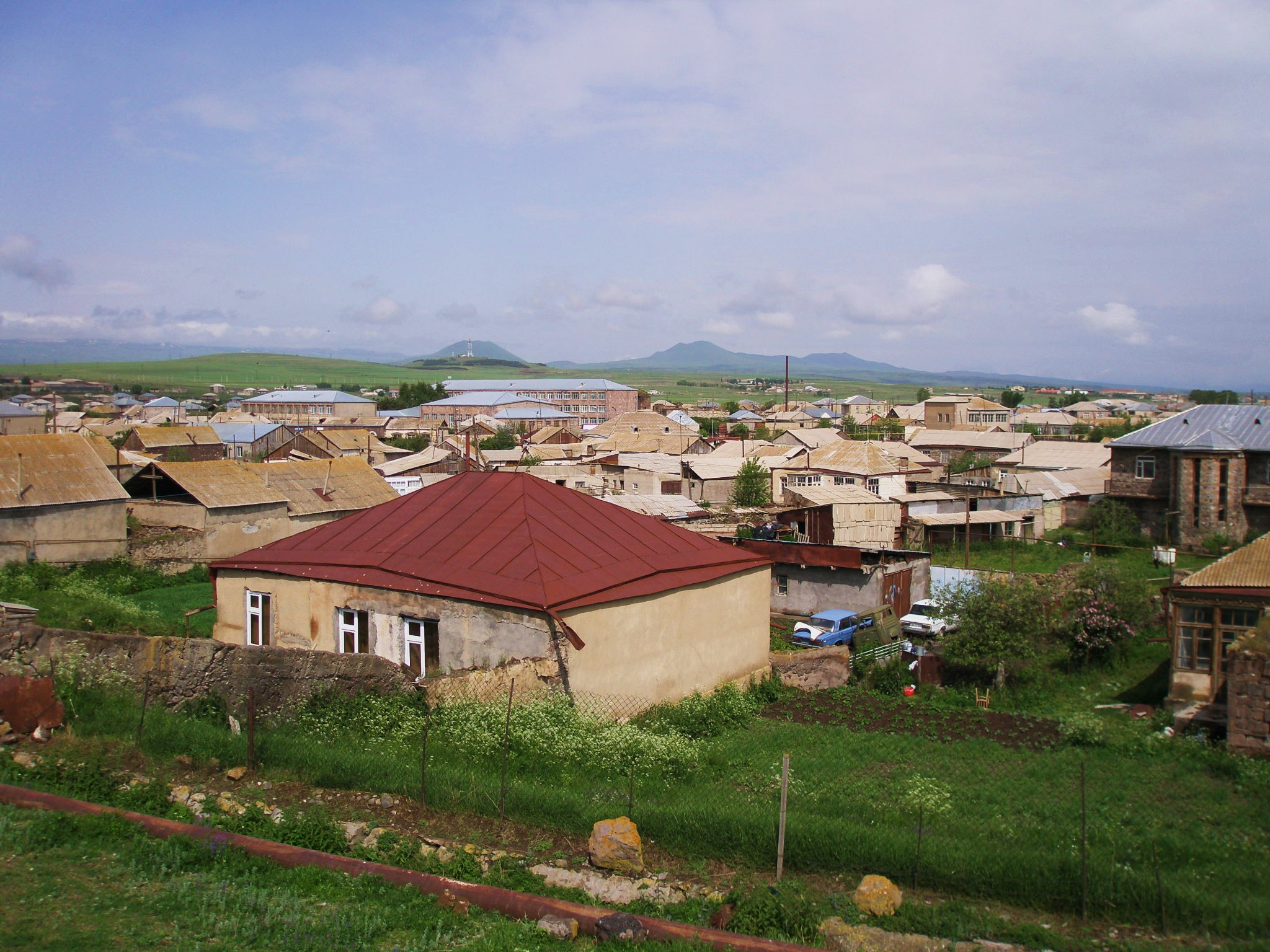
A view of Noratus
