= Akner monastery =

Destroyed Armenian monastery

Akner monastery Ակներ վանք
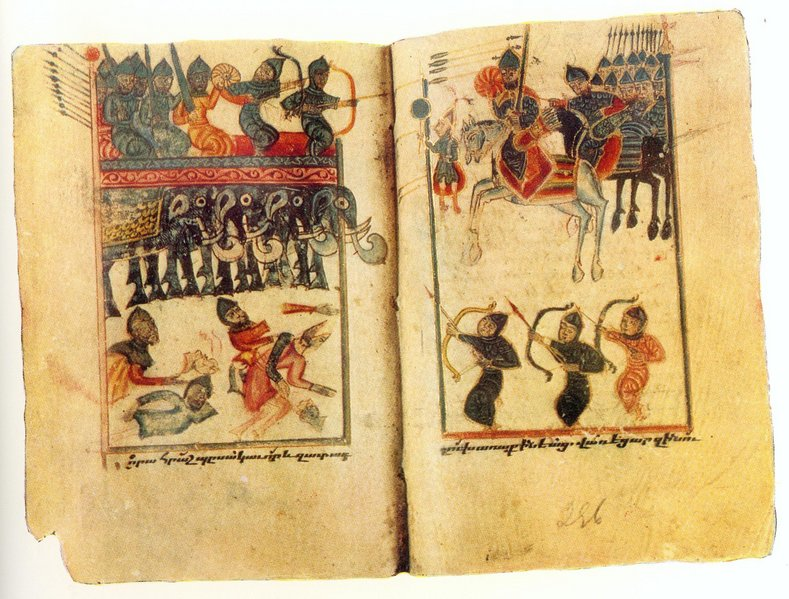
- Manuscript of the Battle of Avarayr, Sharaknots, 1482, Akants Desert, MS 1620, 295b-296a, artist Karapet Berkretsi

- Location within Turkey

Religion
- Affiliation: Armenian Apostolic Church
- Region: Mediterranean Region
- Ecclesiastical or organisational status: Damaged in 1896
- Status: Ceased functioning as a monastery in 1896

Location
- Location: (Turkey) Adana province
- State: Turkey
- Coordinates: 37.4509°N 35.4618°E

Architecture
- Type: Armenian church
- Style: Armenian
- Completed: 1203 A.D.

Akner monastery (Armenian: Ակներ վանք, Akner vank') is a destroyed Armenian monastery near the Eğner village of Adana province of modern Turkey. Built in the 12th century, it was heavily ruined by neighbouring Turkish Muslims during the Hamidian massacres in 1896.

== Etymology ==
The monastery was known by different names:

1. Akner (Armenian: Ակներ) (or Aknaghbyur) both in Old Armenian Language mean "brooks". The monastery was built up in the place full of flowing streams near Akner village that geographically correspond to Eğner village at the present time.
2. Akants Anapat (Armenian: Ականց Անապատ) in Armenian language means the temple at the streams.

== The exterior ==
Akner monastery was built not far from Cilician Armenia's Bardzraberd stronghold at the border of two districts: Tsakhut (Armenian: Ցախուտ) and Bardzraberd (Armenian: Բարձրաբերդ) for higher fortress) near the Akner (or Aknaghbyur) village at the middle course of Seyhan River (Armenian: Սարան գետ) for Mountainous river) in the hilly place full of brooks.
Akner monastery consisted of three churches:

1. St. Astvadzatzin (Armenian: Սբ. Աստվածածին) meaning Saint Mother of God.
2. St. Hakob (or St. Nshan) (Armenian: Սբ. Հակոբ (or Սբ. Նշան)) meaning Saint Jack (or Saint Sign).
3. St. Arakelots (Armenian: Սբ. Առաքելոց) meaning Saint Apostles.

== History ==
Akner was one of the most significant monasteries of Cilician Armenia. It was built by the king Levon II in 1198–1203 AD and was anointed by the Catholicos of Cilician Armenia Gregory Apirat. Akner's foundation coincided with Cilician Armenia's golden age; that is why it was also functioning as the place of council of war and ecclesiastical council. We have eulogizing notes left from Armenian historians (listed below) about Akner monastery:

- Samuel Anetsi (Armenian: Սամուել Անեցի) (12th century)
- Kirakos Gandzaketsi (Armenian: Կիրակոս Գանձակեցի) (13th century)
- Vahram Rabuni (Armenian: Վահրամ Րաբունի) (13th century)
- Hetum Historian (Armenian: Հեթում Պատմիչ, Hetum Patmich) (14th century)
- David Baghishetsi (Armenian: Դավիթ Բաղիշեցի) (17th century)

Akner monastery played a big role in Cilician Armenia's enlightening, cultural and spiritual life. Besides the monastic functions it has:

1. High level of creating manuscripts and handwritten books.
2. Medieval school and university.
3. Matenadaran (storage of medieval Armenian books, manuscripts) and picture gallery.
4. House of Armenian church musics.

In the short period Akner became famous of its high-level manuscriptal and drawing craft. Akner was highly associated with many other medieval Armenia's monasteries. Manuscripts of Petros, David, Barsegh, Ghazar, Vardan, Nerses, Serovbe (son of Nerses) and some other monks told about unsurpassed skill of hand-writing and graphical works in Akner monastery. Since the early 13th century. Akner's religious house existed in the monastery. In 1273 A.D. Grigor Aknertsi became a leader of Akner's order. He has written "The history of Nestorians" (Armenian: Պատմութիւն վասն ազգին նետողաց) book referring to Mikayel Asori's works. The 13th century was a period of growth and Akner's religious house collaborating with another Cilician Armenia's abbeys like Grner and Bardzraberd monasteries created a graphic's school famed in all medieval world.
In Akner monastery studied many enlightened personalities like Poghos (Armenian: Պողոս), Grigor (Armenian: Գրիգոր), Karapet (Armenian: Կարապետ), Hovhannes (Armenian: Հովհաննես), Ruben (Armenian: Ըռուբեն), Barsegh (Armenian: Բարսեղ) monks and many others. Akner's religious house has a spirited participation in Cilician Armenia's different scopes of activity. Armenian Catholicos Grigor Anavarzatsi 7th (Armenian: Գրիգոր Է Անավարզեցի) it the letter to the king Levon II in 1306 A.D. says "Akner's religious house consists of very decent, exemplary, clever people".
It the year 1307th at the great ecclesiastica assembly in the capital Sis Akner's religious house, headed by Vardan archimandrite and Sargis abbot, has also taken party. King Hetum 1st after his retirement in 1270 has a solitary life inside Akner monastery. In Akner monastery was buried the heart of the king Levon II, Paghtin Marajakht, many princes, abbots and monks. Approximately in 1375 the monastery was damaged by Mameluks. But many years later it was reconstructed and in the 18th century, Akner was a functioning Armenian monastery in Adana province of Ottoman Empire. At the Hamidian massacres in 1896 the monastery was heavily ruined.

== Manuscripts from Akner in a good state of preservation ==
Matenadaran Institute contains numerous manuscripts and books written in Akner since 1215 to 1342 A.D. There are a long list of works from Akner like chronicles, Bibles, reproductions of works of Mesrop Mashtots, Grigor Narekatsi, Sharakans (collections of Armenian hymns), reproductions of works of Agatangeghos' "History of Armenia". About 30 manuscripts telling about different events and historical personalities. The painting school of Akner's religious house was exercising a new technique of paintings and iconography with the uniformity of human bodies and realistic images so characteristic of them. They using a distinctive technology of painting finding unique solutions. Best example of their style contains the book "The Bible of the queen Keran" (Armenian: Կեռան թագուհու Ավետարանը) written in 1272 dedicated to another famous book written earlier in Akner "The monastery called as Akner" (Armenian: Ի վանս, որ կոչի Ակներ).
