= Ghukas Chubaryan =

Armenian sculptor (1923–2009)

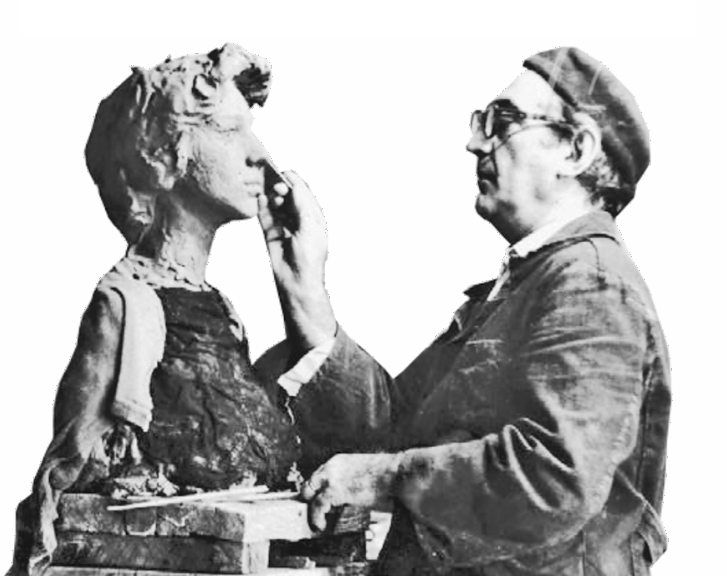
- Born: 1923; Yerevan, Armenia
- Died: March 23, 2009 (aged 85–86); Yerevan, Armenia
- Education: National Polytechnic University of Armenia
- Occupation: sculptor

Ghukas Chubaryan (Armenian: Ղուկաս Չուբարյան; 1923 – March 23, 2009) was a prominent Armenian sculptor, People's Artist of Armenia. He authored numerous works that later became symbols of the Armenian capital.

Chubaryan became famous in 1968, after his basalt statue of Mesrop Mashtots was located in front of the Matenadaran.

One of the most important Armenian artists in the post-Stalin Soviet period, Chubaryan also made the prominent decorative ornaments on the government building in the 1950s and the facade of Yerevan Opera House in 1980s. He is also known as the sculptor of Hovhannes Tumanyan (monuments in Tumanyan's birthplace Dsegh, Armenia and in the front of Tumanyan's museum, Yerevan) and Alexander Spendiaryan monuments (Opera House square and in the front of Musical school named after Alexander Spendiaryan, Yerevan).
