= Levon Abrahamian =

Armenian anthropologist and historian

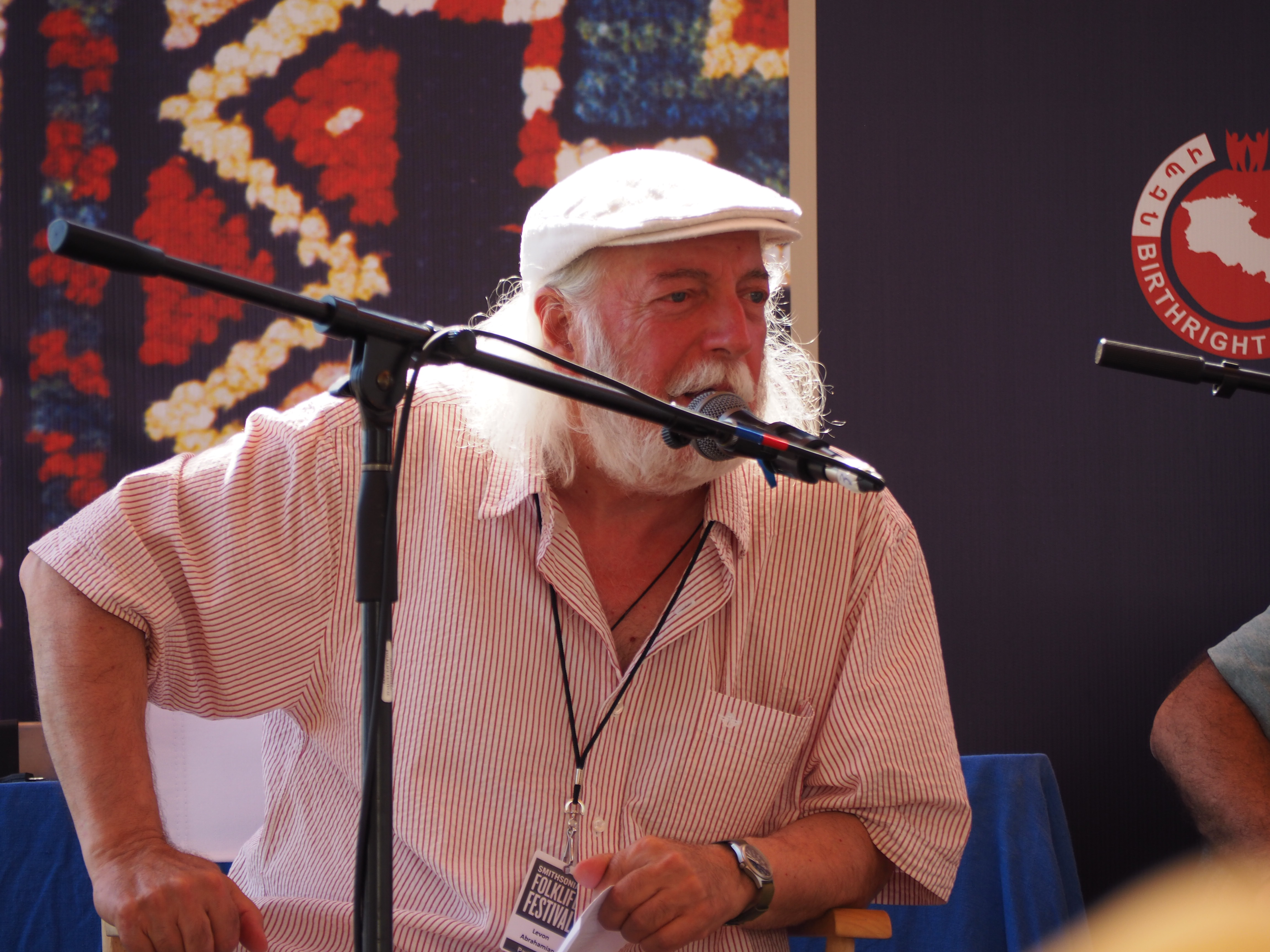
Levon Abrahamian

Levon H. Abrahamian (Armenian: Լևոն Աբրահամյան; born January 2, 1947) is an Armenian anthropologist and historian.

== Biography and career ==
Abrahamian was born in Yerevan, Soviet Armenia on January 2, 1947. He graduated from Yerevan State University (YSU) with M.S. in biophysics in 1970 and from the Institute of Anthropology and Ethnography of the Soviet Academy of Sciences in 1978 as Candidate of Sciences in Cultural and Social Anthropology. He joined the Institute of Archaeology and Ethnography at the Academy of Sciences of Soviet Armenia in 1978, initially working as a junior researcher until 1988 and then as senior researcher. In 2005 he headed the Institute's Department of Contemporary Anthropological Studies.

Abrahamian has taught at YSU since 1990. He has also taught as a visiting professor at the University of Pittsburgh (1994), Columbia University (2001), University of California, Los Angeles (2008), and University of California, Berkeley (1997 and 2015).

In November 2018 Abrahamian was elected president of the Board of Trustees of the Matenadaran.

== Recognition ==
Abrahamian is a corresponding member of the National Academy of Sciences of Armenia (2006). In 2009 Armenian President Serzh Sargsyan awarded him the title of an Honored Worker of Culture.

== Research and publications ==
Abrahamian's anthropological research focuses on ancient and modern Armenia and Armenians, including Armenian identity, comparative mythology, rituals, urban anthropology and the cultures of Australia and Oceania. He has authored five books and numerous papers.

His two English-language books, Armenian Folk Arts, Culture, and Identity (2001) and Armenian Identity in a Changing World (2006) received positive reviews.

=== Books ===
- Abrahamian, Levon. Primitive Festival and Mythology (1983). Yerevan: Academy of Sciences of Armenian SSR Press (in Russian)
- Abrahamian, Levon, and Nancy Sweezy, eds. Armenian Folk Arts, Culture, and Identity (2001). Indiana University Press
- Conversations Near a Tree. Moscow: Languages of Slavonic Cultures, 2005, in Russian
- Abrahamian, Levon. Armenian Identity in a Changing World (2006). Mazda Publishers ISBN 1-56859-185-3
- Kharatyan, Hranush; Shagoyan, Gayane; Marutyan, Harutyun; Abrahamian, Levon. Stalinist Repressions in Armenia: History, Memory [Ստալինյան բռնաճնշումները Հայաստանում. պատմություն, հիշողություն, առօրյա] (2015). "Gitutyun" Publishing of the National Academy of Sciences of Armenia (in Armenian)

=== Articles ===
- "On Schneider's Symbolic Culture Theory", Current Anthropology, Vol. 21, No. 2 (Apr., 1980), pp. 255–256
- "The secret police as a secret society: fear and faith in the USSR" Russian Social Science Review 35, no. 3 (1994), pp. 81–95.
- "Typology of Aggressiveness and National Violence in the Former USSR", International Journal on Minority and Group Rights, Vol. 4, No. 3/4, (1996/97), pp. 263–278
- "Lenin as a trickster" Anthropology & archeology of Eurasia 38, no. 2 (1999), pp. 8–26.
- "The Chained Hero: The Cave and the Labyrinth", Iran & the Caucasus, Vol. 11, No. 1 (2007), pp. 89–99
- "From Carnival Civil Society Toward a Real Civil Society: Democracy Trends in Post-Soviet Armenia" Anthropology & archeology of Eurasia 50, no. 3 (2012): pp. 11–50.
- "Velvet Revolution, Armenian Style", Demokratizatsiya, vol. 26, n. 4, Fall 2018
