= Suren Nazaryan =

Armenian sculptor (1929–1999)

- Born: Suren Nazaryan; July 29, 1929; Yerevan, Armenia
- Died: January 15, 1999 (aged 69)
- Education: Yerevan State Institute of Theatre and Cinematography, Yerevan, Armenia
- Known for: sculpture

Suren Nazaryan (Armenian: Սուրեն Բենիամինի Նազարյան; July 30, 1929 – January 15, 1999) was an Armenian sculptor.

== Biography ==
He was born in Yerevan, Armenia. He received his professional education at Yerevan's Panos Terlemezyan Fine Arts College, from 1947 to 1951. He continued his education at Yerevan's State Fine Arts and Theatre Institute from 1951 to 1957. He began his career by participating in several art exhibitions organized by the Union of Artists. His artistic talent, professional skills, and consistent participation in different art shows, secured his membership to the Union of Artists of the USSR. Early works of his career are mainly figurative realistic compositions. One of his first recognized works is a multi-figure composition called Political Prisoners. In 1959, it was chosen for the permanent exposition at Yerevan's State History Museum of Armenia. Another early work is a single-figure composition called "In the Beginning of the Era", 1962. From 1957 to 1973, he taught sculpting at the Terlemezyan Fine Arts College and was a professor at the Fine Arts and Theatre Institute from 1969 to 1974. Many of his students went on to become outstanding sculptors in Armenia.

Being a young sculptor, in 1964, Nazaryan received permission from Catholicos of All Armenians, Vazgen I, to create the bas-reliefs of the five famous cathedrals of Armenian architecture (St. Hripsime, Etchmiadzin, Zvartnots, Holy Cross Akhthamar, and Ani) for the throne hall of Catholicos’ residence. Nazaryan was one of the new generation of Armenian sculptors of the post-Stalinist period. Nazaryan created several monuments in different cities and towns of Armenia and the Soviet Union. Nazaryan also created a statue of medieval Armenian poet, Frik. It is one of six statues of renowned historical Armenian individuals. The statue is sculpted out of basalt, and in 1967, was placed at the exterior of the Matenadaran (repository of manuscripts and museum of bibliography) located in the capital city of Armenia, Yerevan. In 1977, the memorial complex dedicated to a hero of the 1918-21 Russian civil war, commander Gai (Haik Bzhshkyants) ceremonially opened in Yerevan. The equestrian's bronze statue stands fifteen meters high (with pedestal), and has a fifty meter long basalt wall of sculptural relief containing the battle scene of the Iron Division. The project, whose co-creator was architect Sarkis Gurzadyan, won the 1st place prize from the Ministry of Culture in a juried competition. In the village of Sanahin, next to the Home-Museum of the Mikoyan brothers, a monument created by Nazaryan and dedicated to military aircraft designer Artem Mikoyan was opened in 1982. The bronze memorial bust of Artem Mikoyan featured a granite pedestal, abstract sculptural forms, the actual MIG-21 fighter, along with Home-Museum and original architectural solution of architect Sarkis Gurzadyan.

Nazaryan also created many portraits. One of them is the marble bust of William Shakespeare which, in 1985, was placed in the interior of Sundukyan State Academic Theatre of Yerevan. In 1986, his bronze bust of composer Giuseppe Verdi received a silver medal of the Transcaucasian Biennale in Tbilisi, Georgia. Being a member of the administration of the Union of Artists of Armenia at the 10th Assembly of Artists of Armenia, Nazaryan was elected and served for two terms (1973–1981) as an Executive Secretary of the Union of Artists and as President of the Fine Arts Fund of Armenia. In 1970, Nazaryan was honored by the Supreme Soviet of Armenia. He received a Medal for Valorous Work. In 1979, he received another honorary award from the President of the Supreme Soviet of Armenia. The title of Merited Artist was granted to Nazaryan in 1980. The highest title of honor, People's Artist of Armenia, was granted to him in 1991.

The last eight years of his life, Suren Nazaryan lived in the United States. He planned a sculptural redesign project for the exterior of Yerevan's Republic Square museum building. The project was presented by Nazaryan and the project's co-designer architect Stepan Qyurkchyan, and was selected by the authoritative jury in a 1988 competition. Nazayan died in the United States in 1999, before he was able to complete the project.

== Gallery ==
Works of Suren Nazaryan
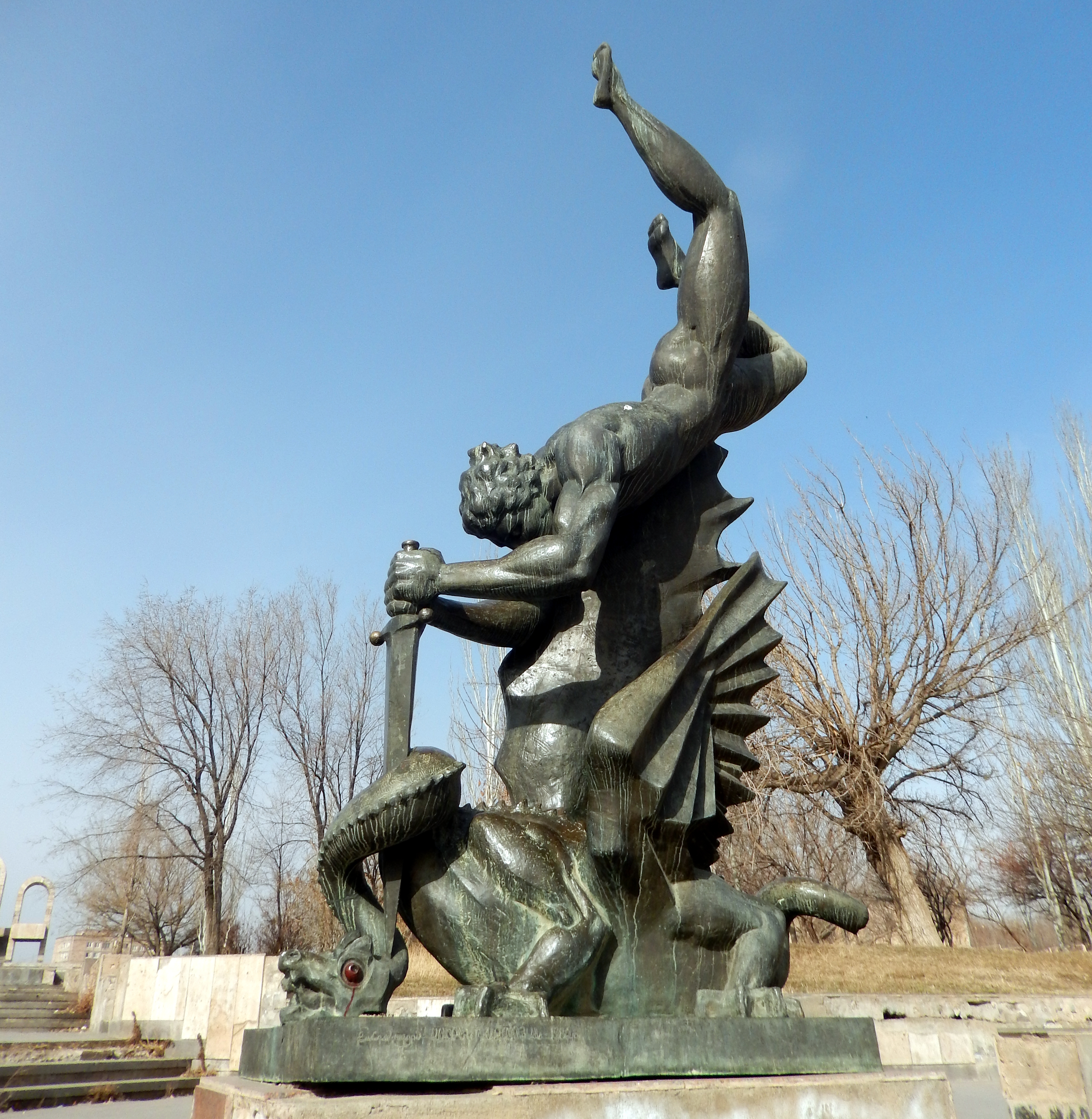
Memorial complex for the 40th anniversary of the victory in World War II, "The Dragon Slayer"

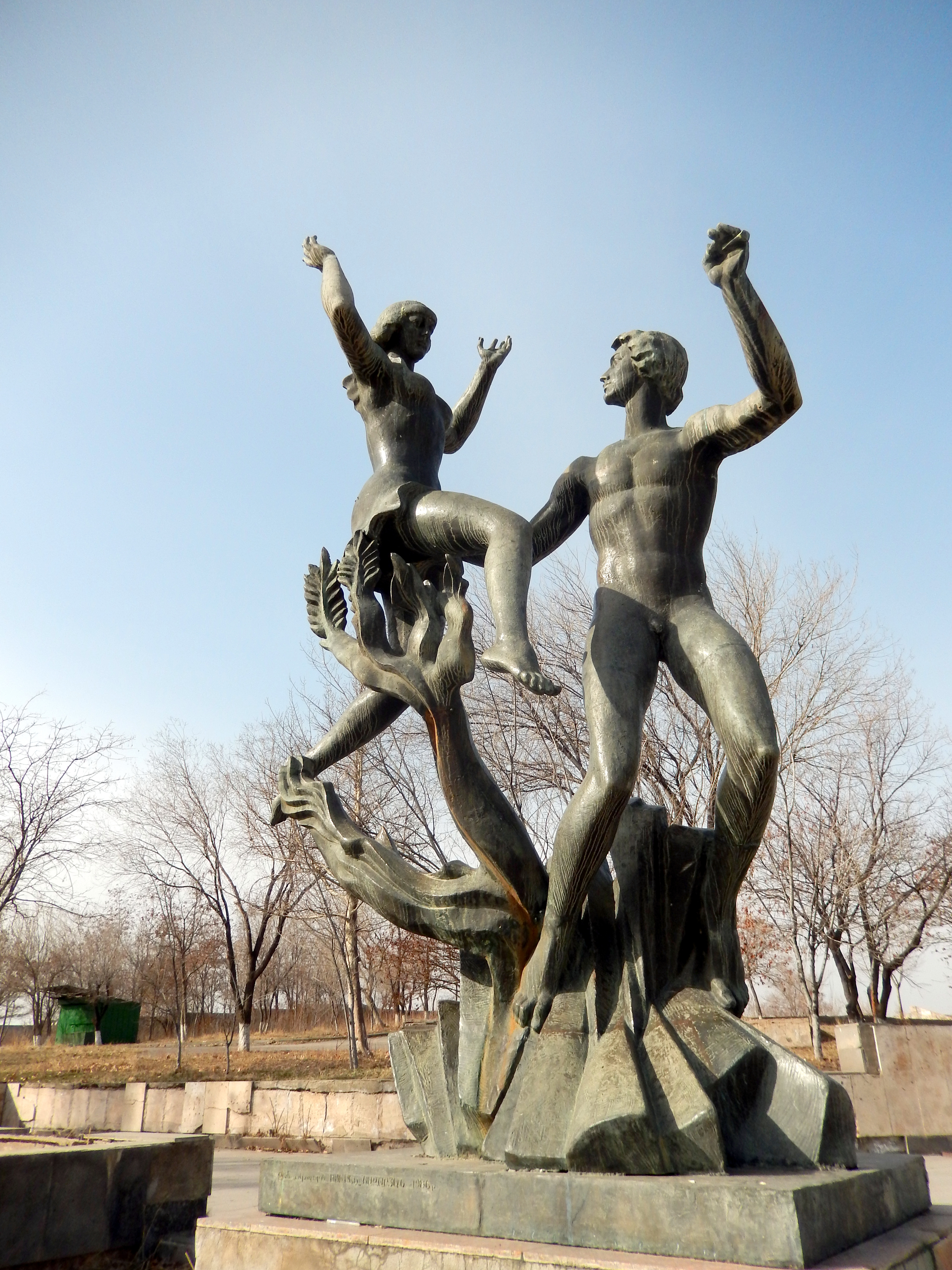
Memorial complex for the 40th anniversary of the victory in World War II, "Peace"

== Legacy ==
Nazaryan's son Arshak Nazaryan (born 1961) is also a sculptor in Armenia.
