= Noratus Cemetery =

Cemetery in Armenia

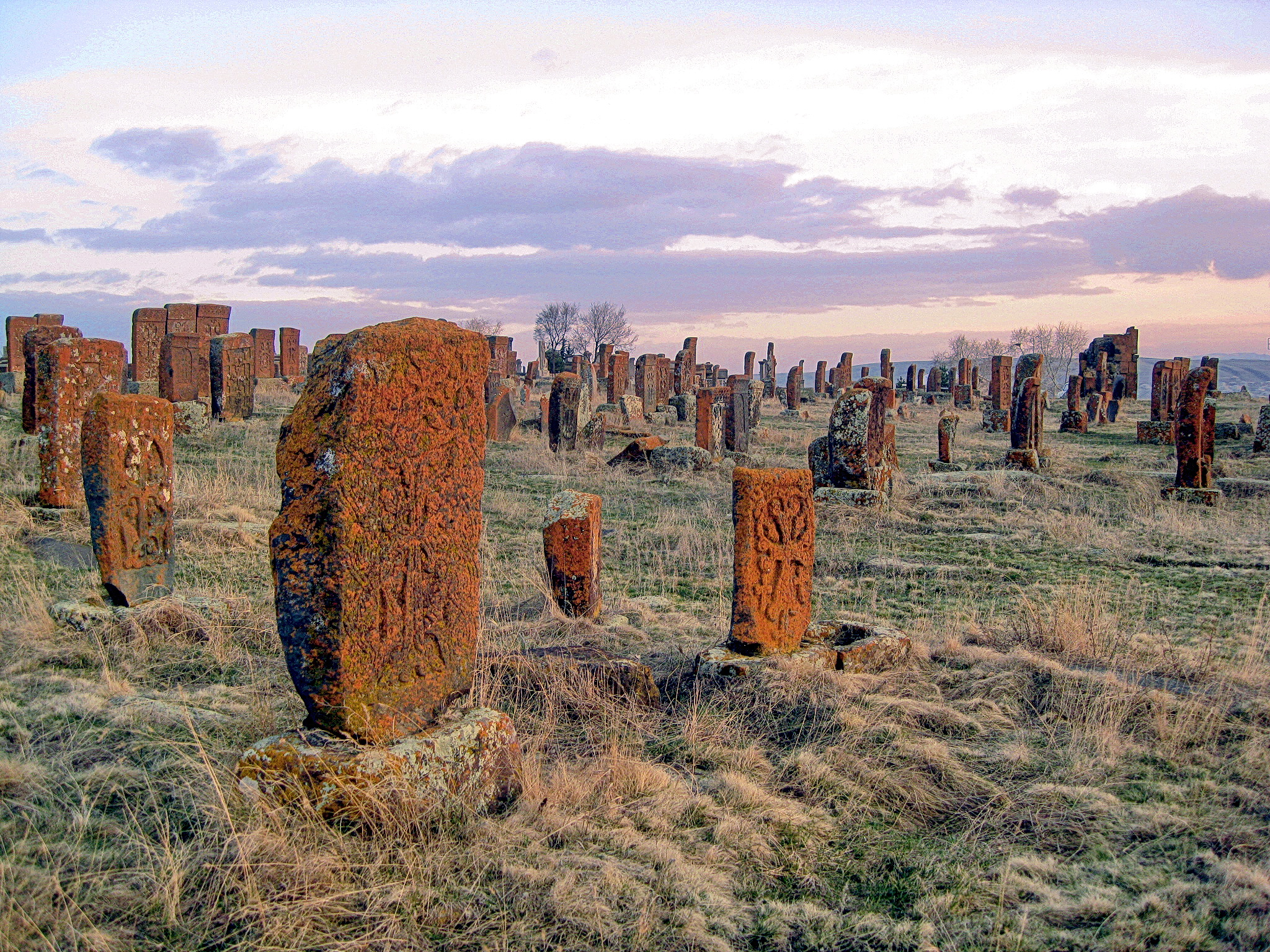
- Khachkars at Noratus Cemetery
- Interactive map of Noratus Cemetery

Details
- Established: 10th century
- Location: Noratus, Gegharkunik Province, Armenia
- Coordinates: 40.373931°N 45.181233°E

Noratus Cemetery (Armenian: Նորատուսի գերեզմանատուն), also spelled Noraduz, is a medieval cemetery with many early khachkars (carved memorial stones) located in the village of Noratus in the Gegharkunik Province of Armenia, near Gavar and Lake Sevan, 90 km north of Yerevan.

The cemetery has the largest cluster of khachkars in Armenia. It is currently the largest surviving cemetery with khachkars, following the destruction of the khachkars in Old Julfa, Nakhichevan by the government of Azerbaijan.

== Khachkars ==
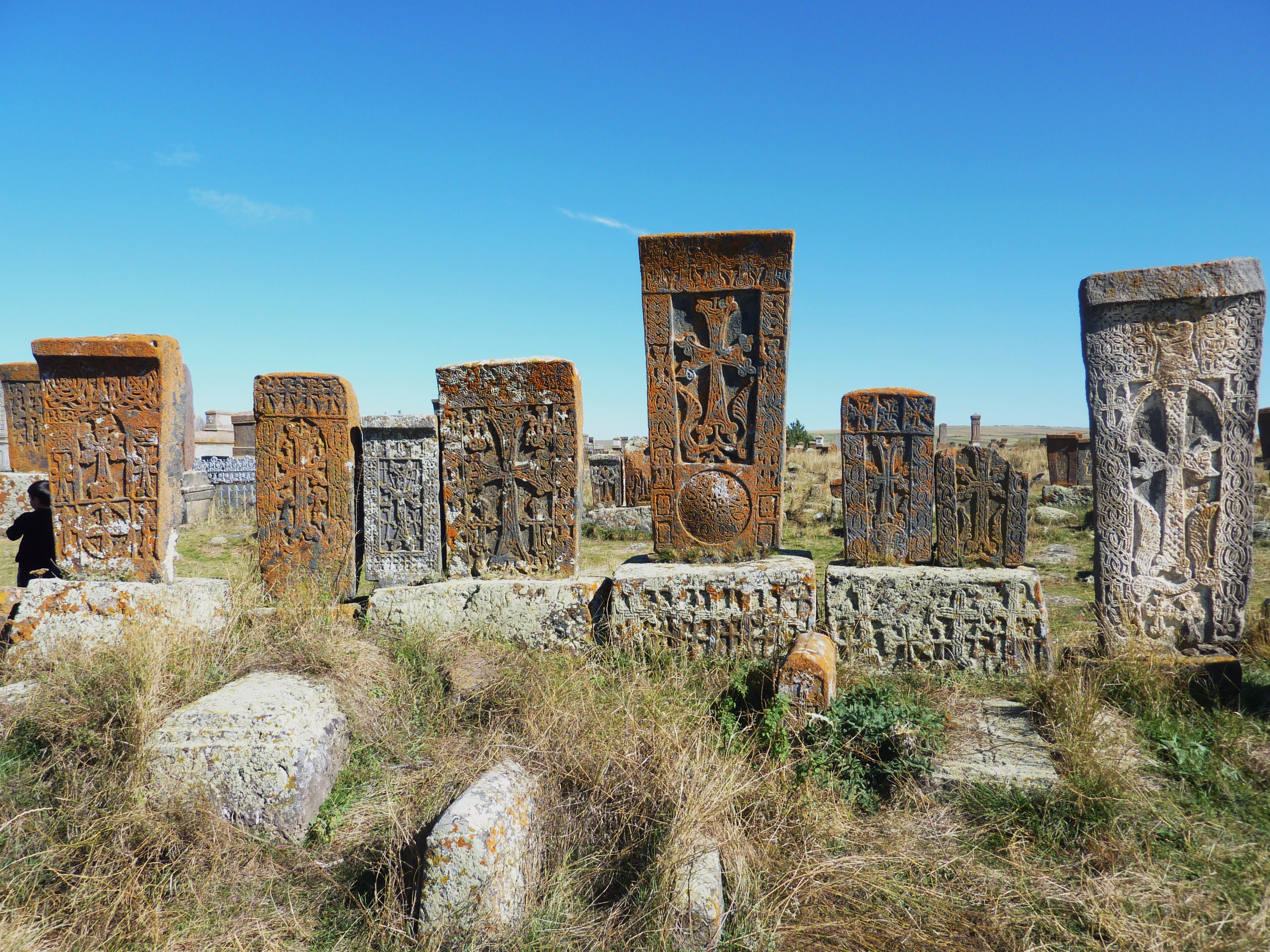
An ensemble of khachkars.

The oldest khachkars in the cemetery dated back to the late 10th century. During the revival of the khachkar tradition in the 16-17th centuries many khachkars were built under the yoke of the Safavid Empire, when oriental influences seeped into Armenian art. Three master carvers from this period carved khachkars in Noraduz, the most notable of whom was Kiram Kazmogh (1551–1610), his contemporaries were Arakel and Meliset. The cemetery is spread over a seven hectare field containing almost a thousand khachkars each of them depicting unique ornamentation. The majority of the khachkars are covered by moss and lichen. Several tombstones in the cemetery depict carved scenes of weddings and farm life. Adjacent to the old cemetery, a new modern cemetery has been built separated by a long fence. Nearby the cemetery in the village there is the Holy Virgin church built in the ninth century. One of the khachkars from the cemetery was donated to the British Museum in 1977 by Catholicos Vazgen I. The front face of the rectangular khachkar has a leaved-cross with two smaller crosses below that are framed with trefoil and bunches of grapes projecting from either side. An inscription on the left side seeks God's mercy for a certain Aputayli.

== Folklore ==
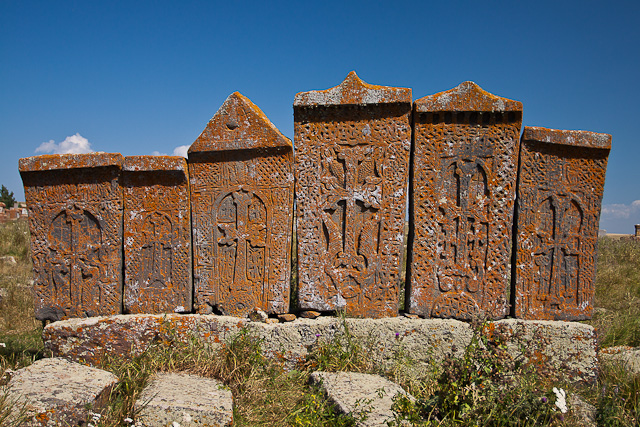
Noratus khachkars

A popular folktale associated with the cemetery concerns the invading army of Tamerlane. According to one story the villagers placed helmets on top of the khachkars and leaned swords against them. From a distance, the khachkars looked like armed soldiers holding a defensive position as a result of which Tamerlane's army retreated.

In another popular story, the 19th-century monk named Ter Karapet Hovhanesi-Hovakimyan, from a monastery near the village, conducted burial services at Noraduz. In order to avoid the two-hour round trip from the cemetery to the monastery, he built himself a small cell in Noraduz. At 90 years old, he asked his brother monks to bury him alive. His last words were: "I do not fear death. I would like you to not be afraid as well. Never fear anything, but God alone. Let anyone who has fear come to me. Pour water at the burial stone, drink the water, wash your face, chest, arms, and legs. Then break the vessel that contained the water. Fear will then abandon you." To this day people come to the monk's grave to perform this ritual, leaving broken pieces of glass scattered all about.
