= Forty Martyrs Cathedral =

Armenian Apostolic church in Aleppo, Syria

Cathedral of the Holy Forty Martyrs Սրբոց Քառասնից Մանկանց Մայր Եկեղեցի
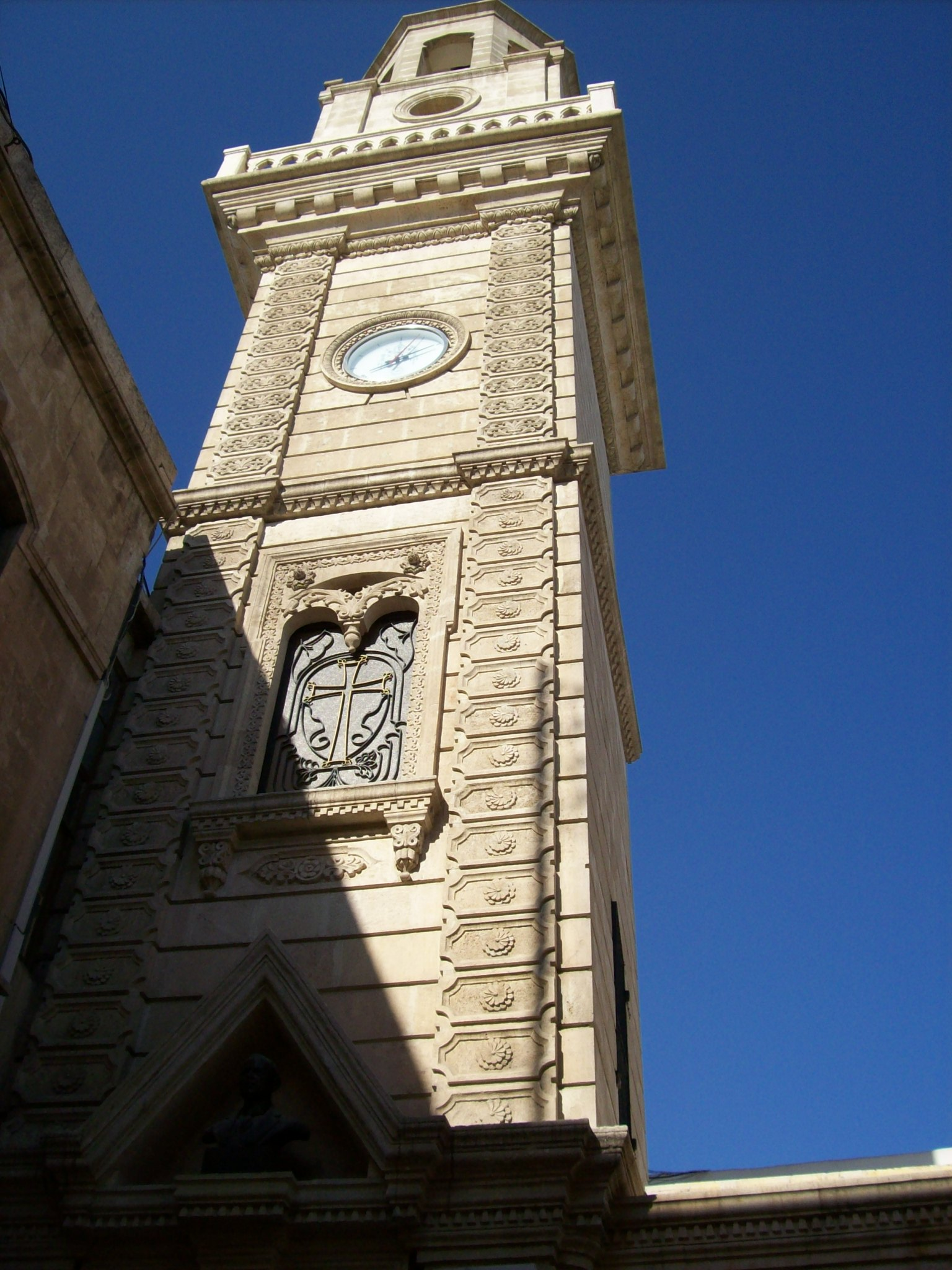
- The belfry of the Forty Martyrs Cathedral

- Location in Aleppo

Religion
- Affiliation: Armenian Apostolic Church, Diocese of Beroea
- Region: Aleppo
- Ecclesiastical or organisational status: inactive
- Year consecrated: 1491

Location
- Location: Al-Jdayde quarter, Aleppo, Syria
- Coordinates: 36.2062°N 37.1552°E

Architecture
- Type: Church
- Style: three-nave basilica with no dome

The Forty Martyrs Armenian Cathedral (Arabic: كنيسة الأربعين شهيد, romanized: Kanīsa al-ʿarbaʾīn šahīd, Armenian: Ս. Քառասնից Մանկանց Մայր Եկեղեցի, romanized: S. K’arrasnits’ Mankants’ Mayr Yekeghets’i) of Aleppo, Syria, is a 15th-century Armenian Apostolic church located in the old Christian quarter of Jdeydeh. It is significant among the Armenian churches for being one of the oldest active churches in the Armenian diaspora and the city of Aleppo. It is a three-nave basilica church with no dome. Its bell tower, of 1912, is considered to be one of the unique samples of the baroque architecture in Aleppo.

== Armenians in Aleppo ==
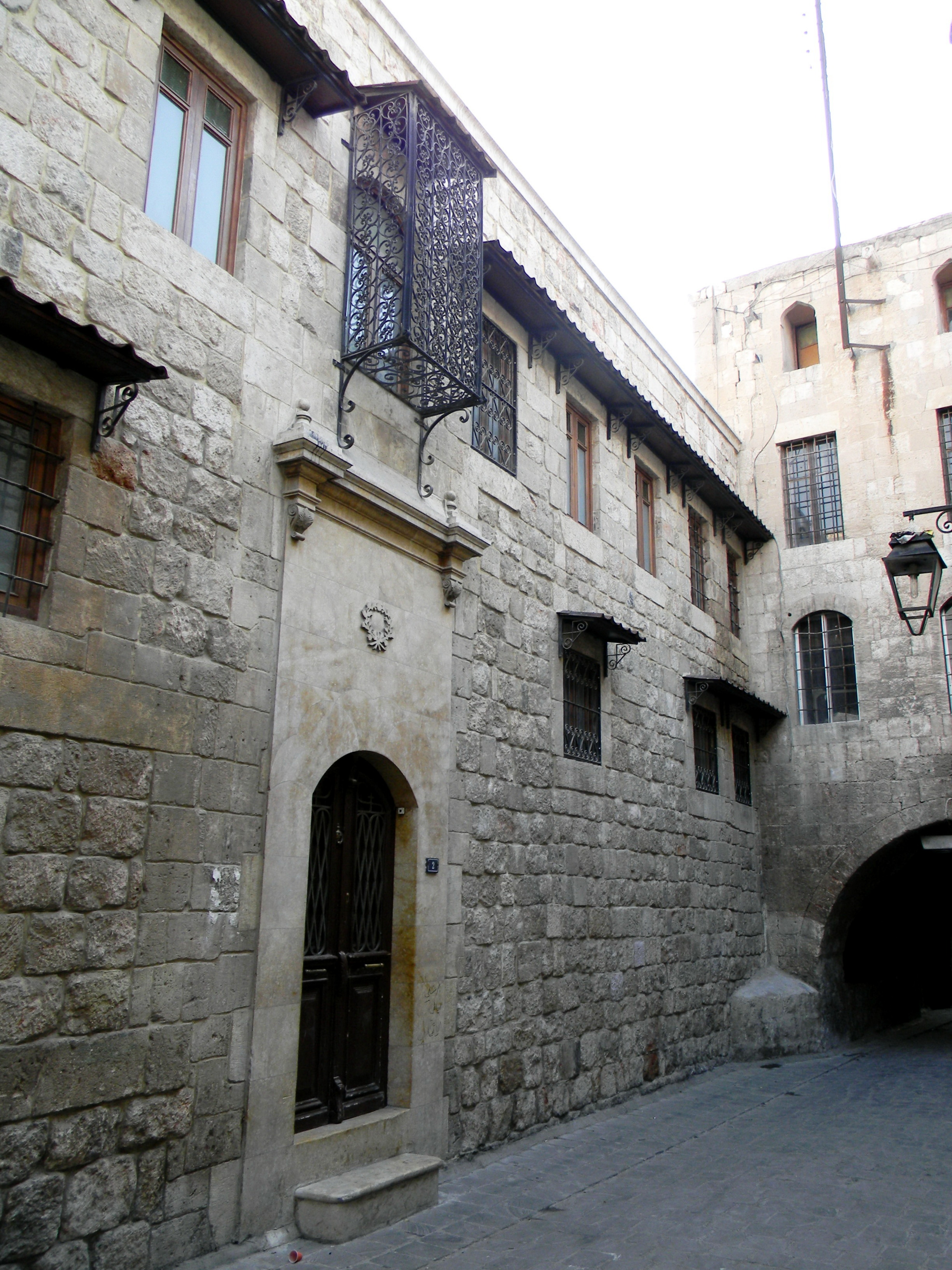
An early 17th century alley at the backside of the cathedral, leading to the old Armenian quarter of Hokedoun

The first significant Armenian presence in the city of Aleppo dates to the 1st century BC, when Armenia under Tigranes the Great subjugated Syria, and chose Antioch as one of the four capitals of the short lived Armenian Empire. After 301 AD, when Christianity became the official state religion of Armenia and its population, Aleppo became an important center for Armenian pilgrims on their way to Jerusalem. Yet, the Armenians did not form into an organized community in Aleppo until the Armenian presence grew noticeably during the 11th century at the times of the Armenian Kingdom of Cilicia, when a considerable number of Armenian families and merchants settled in the city creating their own businesses and residences. With the foundation of Armenian schools, churches and later on the prelacy, Armenians presented themselves as a well-organized community during the 14th century.

The Armenian population of Aleppo continued to grow as Aleppo was swallowed into the Ottoman Empire. The Ottoman Empire had a large indigenous Armenian population in its Eastern Anatolia region, from where some Armenians moved to Aleppo in search of economic opportunity. The Armenian presence in Aleppo grew exponentially after 1915, when it became an immediate haven for refugees of survivors of the Armenian genocide. Tens of thousands of Armenian refugees, likely well over 100,000, settled in Aleppo during this period. By some estimates, Armenians accounted for a quarter of Aleppo's population by the middle of the twentieth century, by which time they had become a respected, upwardly mobile community. Later, as a result of political upheaval in Syria, Armenians began to emigrate to Lebanon and later to Europe, the Americas and Australia, especially in the 1970s and 1980s. Nonetheless, Aleppo remained a center of the worldwide Armenian diaspora, ranging between 50,000 and 70,000 Armenians residents. Tens of thousands of Armenians left during the civil war, and it remains to be seen what will remain of the community when stability returns.

== History ==
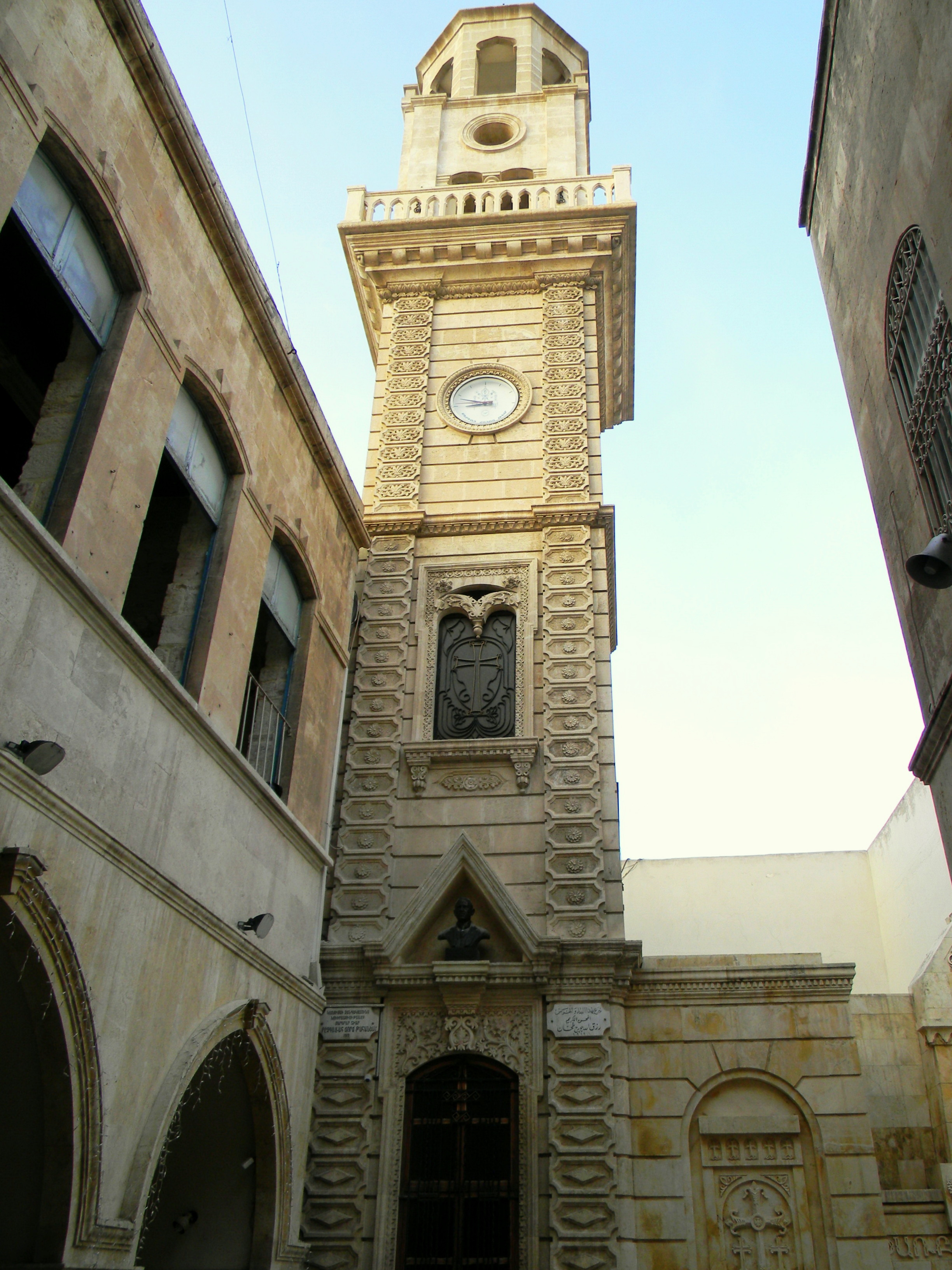
The Forty Martyrs Cathedral

The Armenian church of the Forty Martyrs in Aleppo was mentioned 1476, in the second edition of the book The Exploit of the Holy Bible, written by Father Melikseth in Aleppo.

However, the current building of the church was built and completed in 1491 to replace a small chapel in the old Christian cemetery of the Jdeydeh quarter. The church was named in honour of a group of Roman soldiers who faced martyrdom near the city of Sebastia in Lesser Armenia, and were all venerated in Christianity as the Forty Martyrs of Sebaste. At the beginning, the church was of a small size with a capacity of only 100 seats. In 1499–1500, the church went under large-scale renovations. Within 2 years, it was enlarged and a new prelacy building of the Armenian Diocese of Beroea was built in the church yard, funded through the donation of an Armenian elite named Reyis Baron Yesayi. During the following years, Forty Martyrs Cathedral frequently became a temporary seat of many Armenian catholicoi of the Holy See of Cilicia.

Until 1579, the cathedral was surrounded with the tombstones of the Armenian cemetery, when the cemetery was moved and only clergymen and the elites of the community were allowed to be buried in the church yard.

The Forty Martyrs Cathedral was renovated again in 1616 by the donation of the community leader Khoja Bedig Chelebi and the supervision of his brother Khoja Sanos Chelebi. By the end of the same year, the church was reopened with the presence of Catholicos Hovhannes IV of Aintab (Hovhannes 4th Aintabtsi) and Bishop Kachatur Karkaretsi.

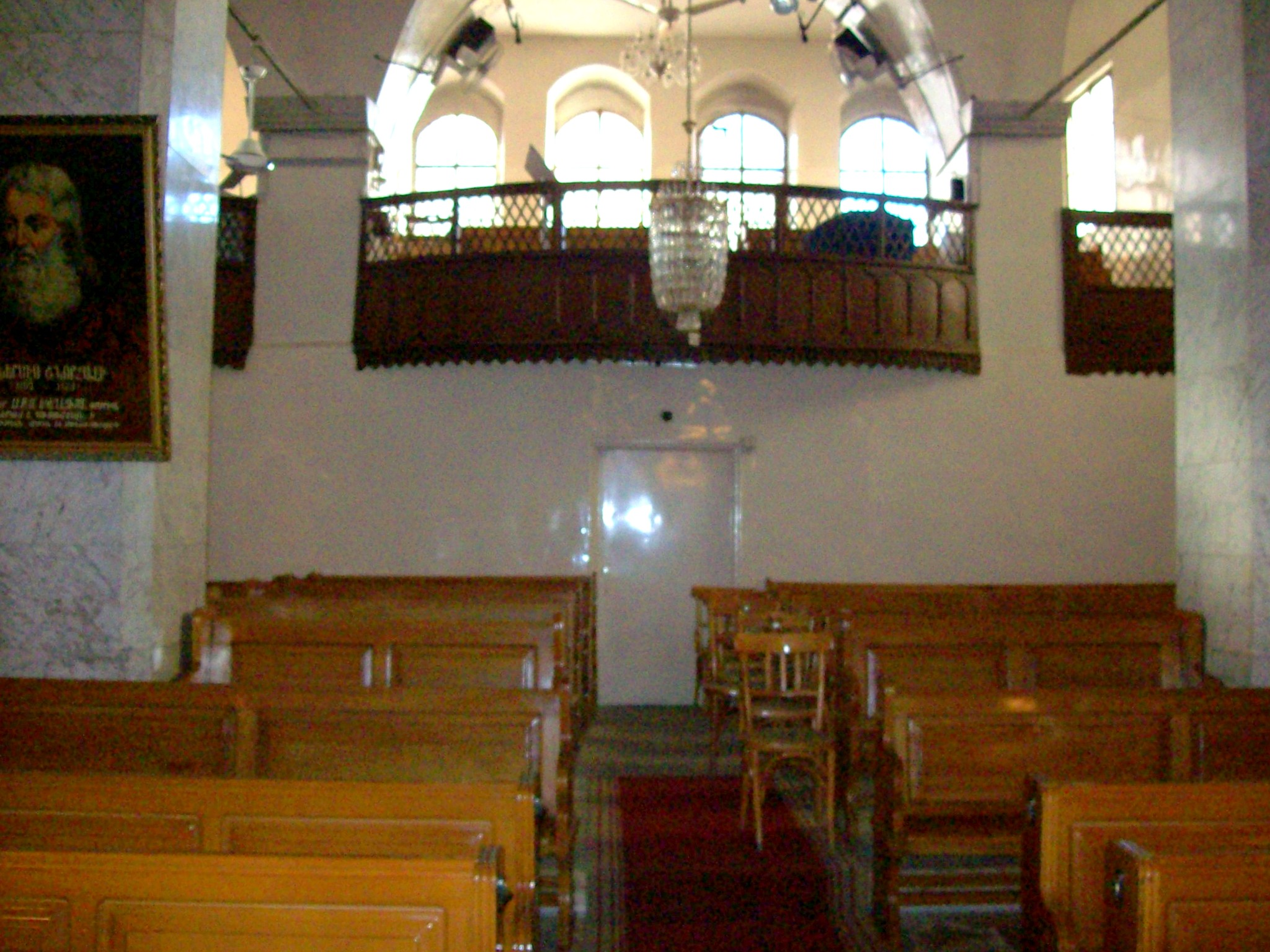
Inside the cathedral

In 1624, as a result of the growing number of Armenian residents and pilgrims, the Armenian prelacy started to build a quarter near the church, which is still known with its original name "Hokedoun" (Spiritual House). It was designated to serve as a rest-house with 23 large rooms for the Armenian pilgrims on their way to Jerusalem. The Hokedoun was built by the donation of Khoja Gharibjan.

The Italian explorer Pietro Della Valle who visited Aleppo in 1625, has described the church as one of the four churches that were built adjacent to each other in one yard with one gate, in the newly created Jdeydeh Christian quarter. The other three churches are the Greek Orthodox Church of the Dormition of Our Lady, the Holy Mother of God Armenian Church (the current Zarehian Treasury) and the old Maronite Church of Saint Elias.

Currently, the cathedral has three altars, an upper story built in 1874 and a baptismal font placed in 1888.

The church never had a belfry until 1912, when a bell tower was erected by the donation of the Syrian-Armenian philanthropist Rizkallah Tahhan from Brazil. During the 2nd half of the 20th century, the interior of the church underwent massive renovations to meet with the requirements of traditional Armenian churches. On 28 May 1991, by the donation of Keledjian brothers from Aleppo, a khachkar-memorial was placed in the churchyard commemorating the victims of the Armenian genocide.

On 26 April 2000, the Armenian community of Aleppo marked the 500th anniversary of the first enlargement of the church under the patronage of Catholicos Aram I, during the period of Archbishop Souren Kataroyan.

== Icons ==
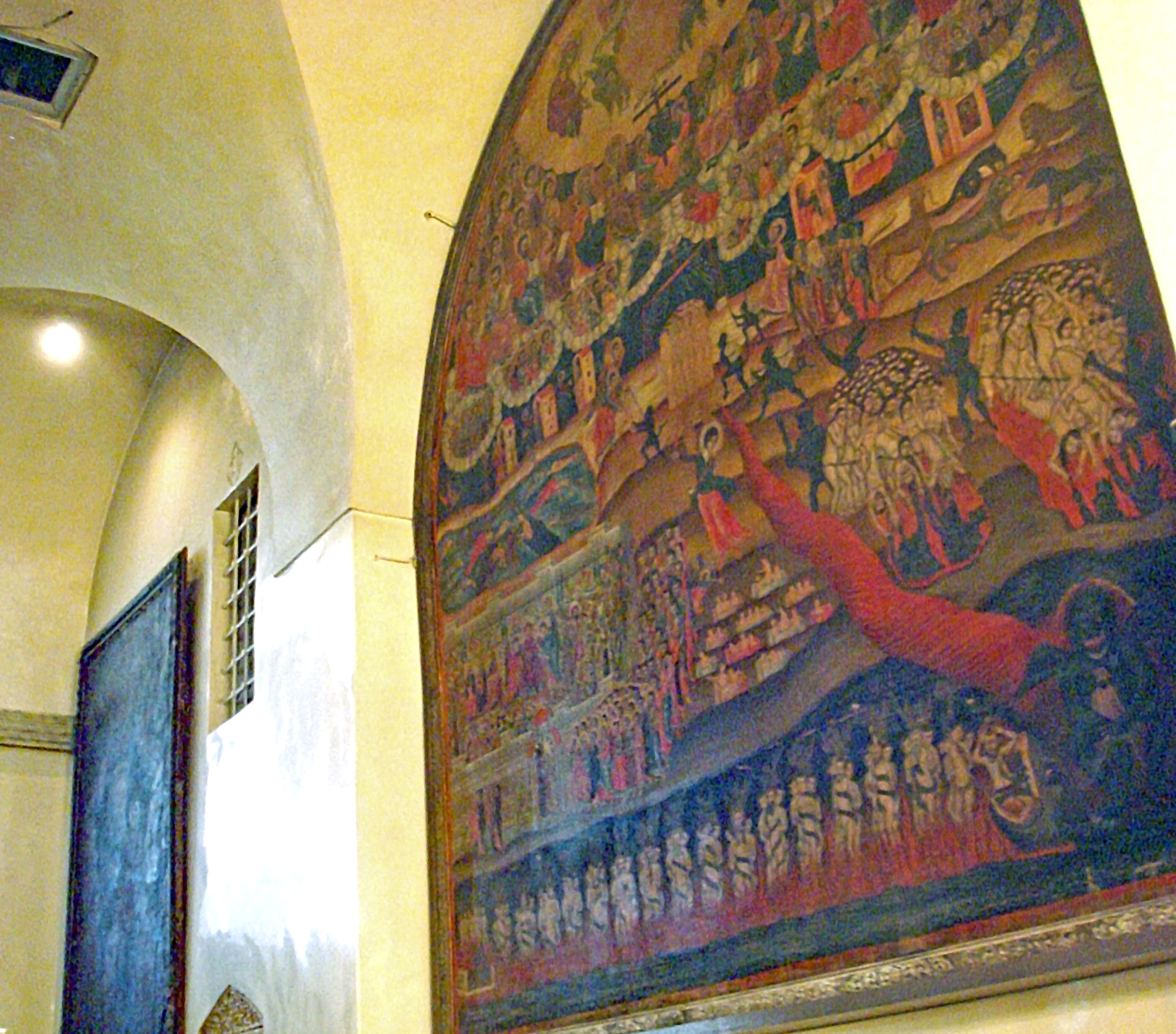
The Last Judgement (1708)

The church is rich for both ancient and modern-day icons, with more than 30 samples:

- The Mother of God (canvas, 96x118, 1663 by Der-Megerdich)
- Virgin Mary with Jesus (canvas, 115x145cm, 1669 by an unknown Armenian painter)
- The Baptism of Jesus (canvas, 66x90cm, from the 17th century)
- The Worship of the Magi (canvas, 112x134cm, from the 17th century by an unknown Armenian painter)
- Saint John The Baptist (wood paint, 39x76cm, 1720 by Kevork Anania)
- Saint Joseph (wood paint, 39x76cm, 1720 by Kevork Anania)
- Virgin Mary with Jesus (wood paint, 46x126cm, 1729 by Kevork Anania)
- The Baptism of Jesus Christ (wood paint, 86x105cm, 1756 by Kevork Anania)
- Virgin Mary surrounded by The Apostles (canvas, 70X80cm, from the late 18th century by an unknown Armenian painter)
- The Last Judgement, one of the most famous icons of the Aleppine school (canvas, 400x600cm, 1703 by Nehmatallah Hovsep)

With the initiative of Archbishop Souren Kataroyan, the majority of the icons were renovated between 1993 and 1996 by the Armenian expert Andranik Antonyan.

== Church of the Holy Mother of God ==
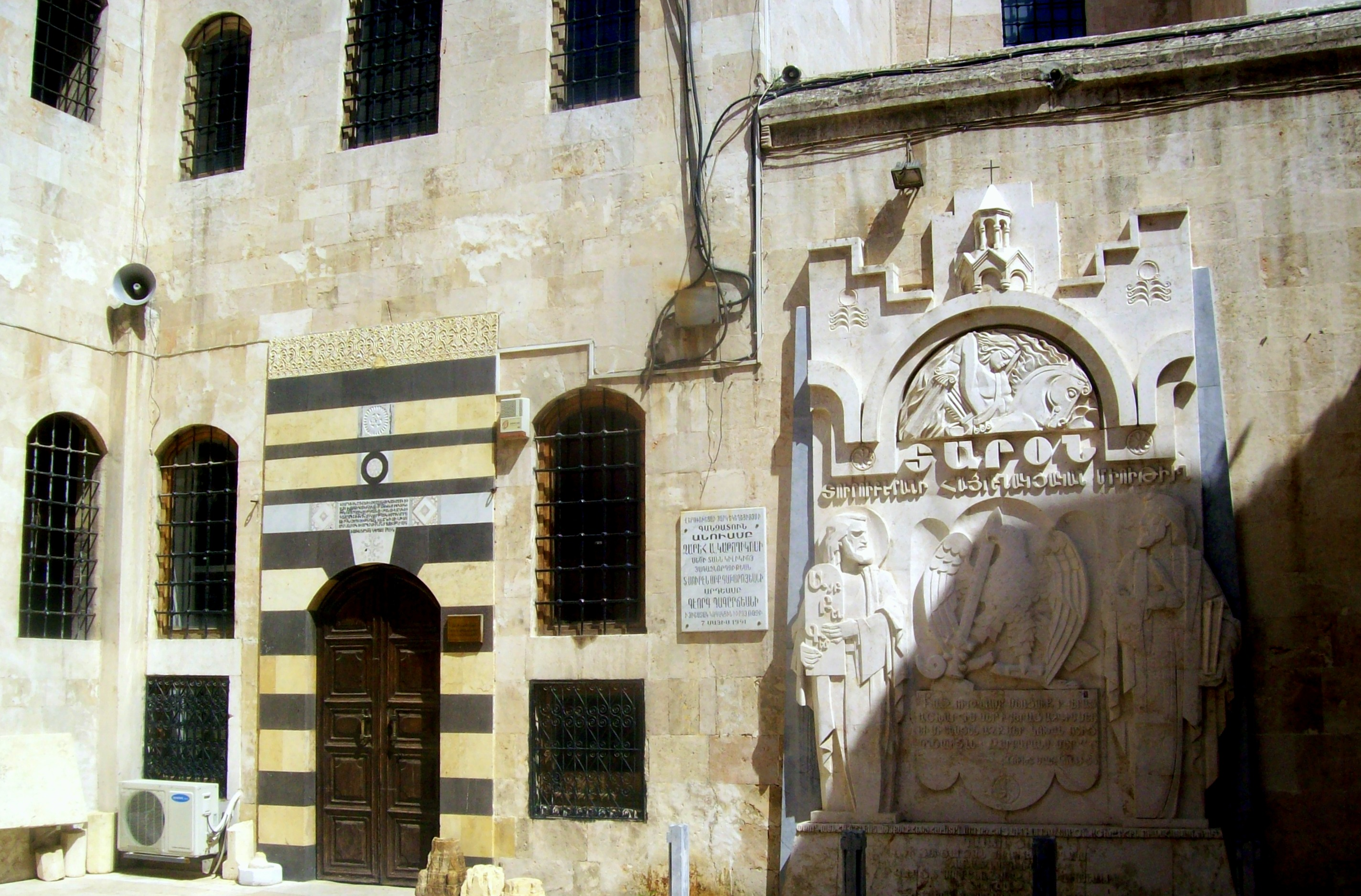
Zarehian Treasury

The old church of the Holy Mother of God was built prior to 1429, at a time when the Armenian community was formed as a significant community in Aleppo with its own clergymen, scholars and the prelacy. This small church has witnessed several renovations, in 1535, 1784, 1849 and 1955 respectively. The church remained active until the beginnings of the 20th century, when it was turned into a library. In 1991, the building was turned into museum and renamed Zarehian Treasury of the Armenian Apostolic Church of Aleppo, in memory of Catholicos Zareh I of the Great House of Cilicia, who had served as archbishop of the diocese of Aleppo before being elected as catholicos.

== Current status ==
The Forty Martyrs Cathedral is the seat of the Armenian Diocese of Beroea and one of the oldest active churches in the city. It is also one of the oldest functioning churches in the Armenian diaspora. The old building of the prelacy within the churchyard is under renovation to serve as an administrative office. The church complex is also home to the Zarehian Treasury, Haygazian Armenian School, Avetis Aharonian theatre hall and Nikol Aghbalian branch of Hamazkayin Educational and Cultural Society. The current building of the prelacy stands in front of the cathedral.

On April 28, 2015, parts of the Forty Martyrs church compound were destroyed in a suspected bombing or artillery attack; the church itself and the bell tower survived the attack. After the last anti-regime rebels left the city in December 2016, renovation works were announced in July 2017. The reconstruction lasted two years, until March 31, 2019, when reconstruction was achieved. The church was reconsecrated by Catholicos Aram I.

== Gallery ==
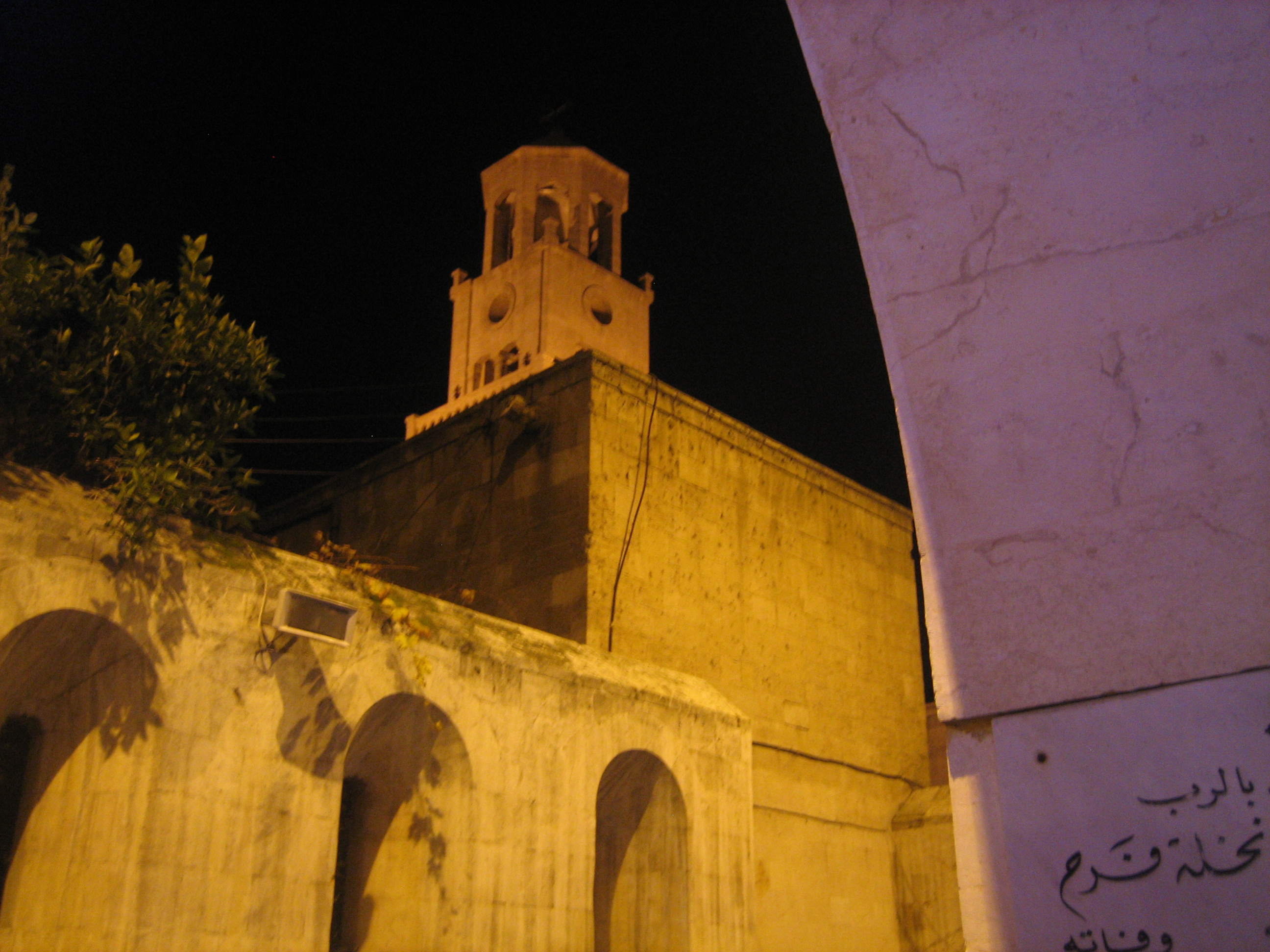
The belfry at night

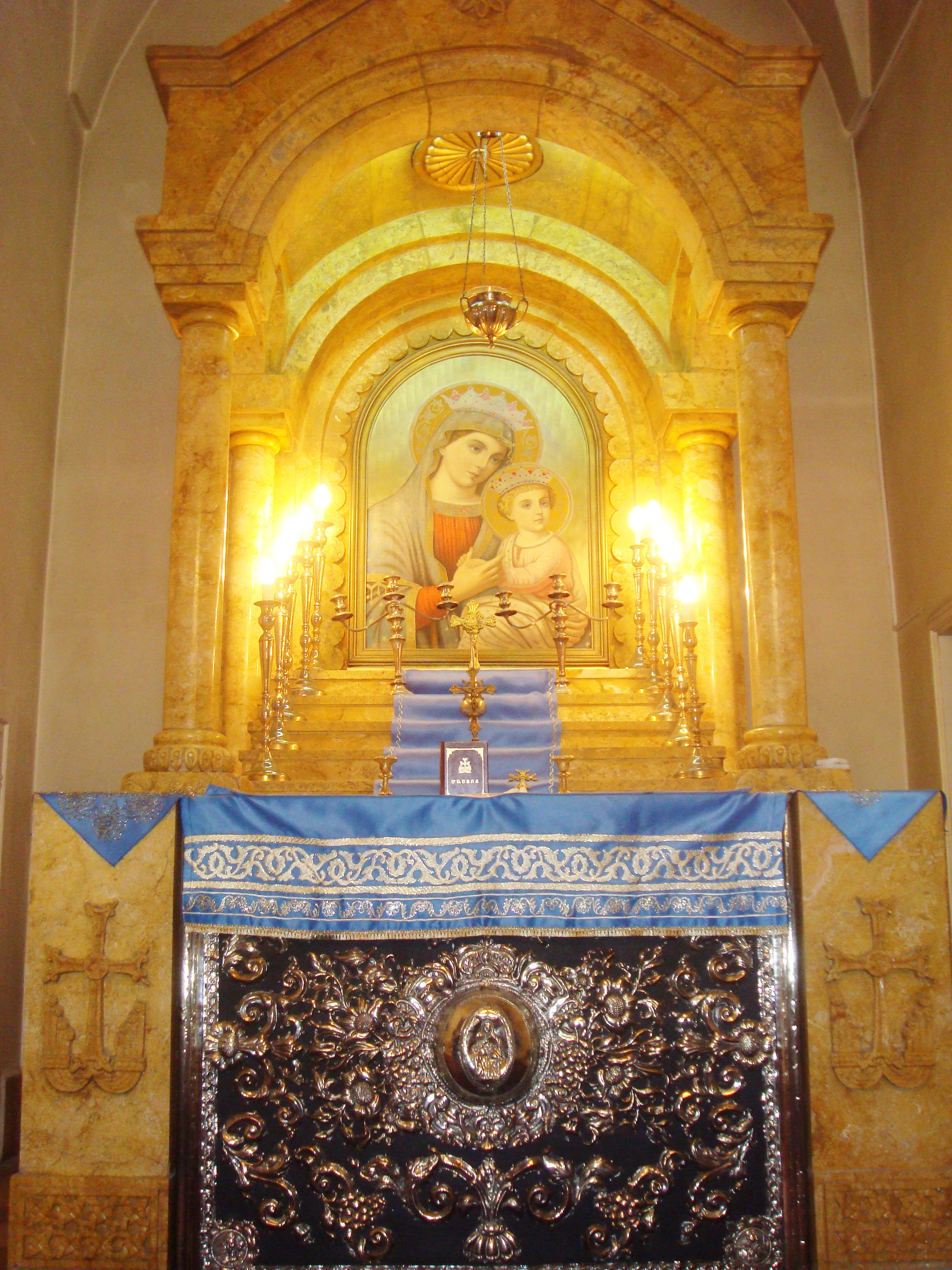
The northern altar

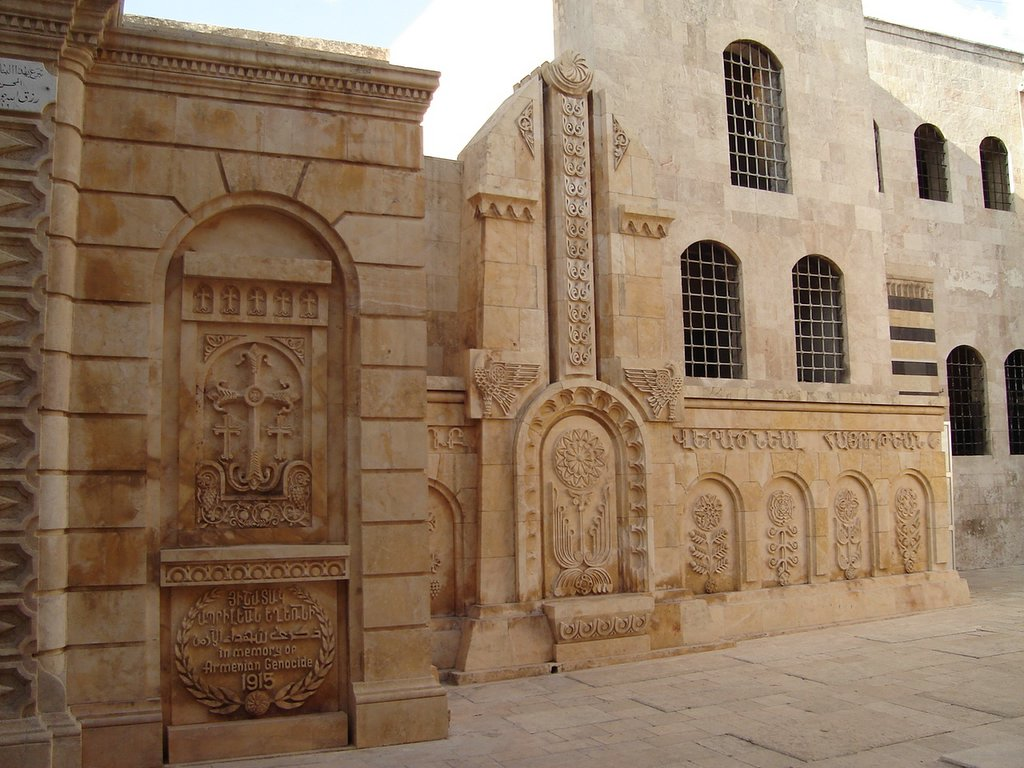
The Armenian genocide monument in the church yard

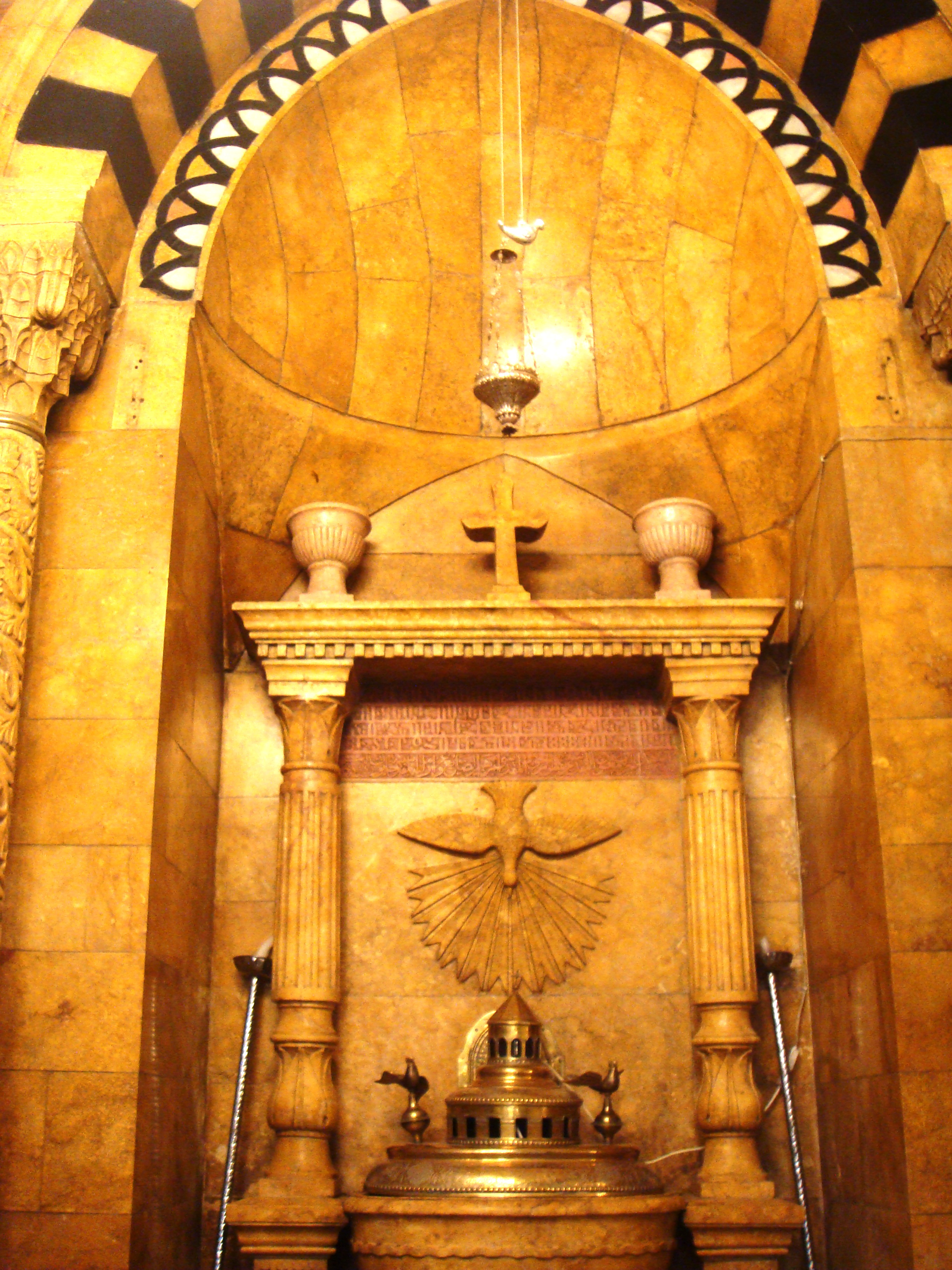
The baptism font

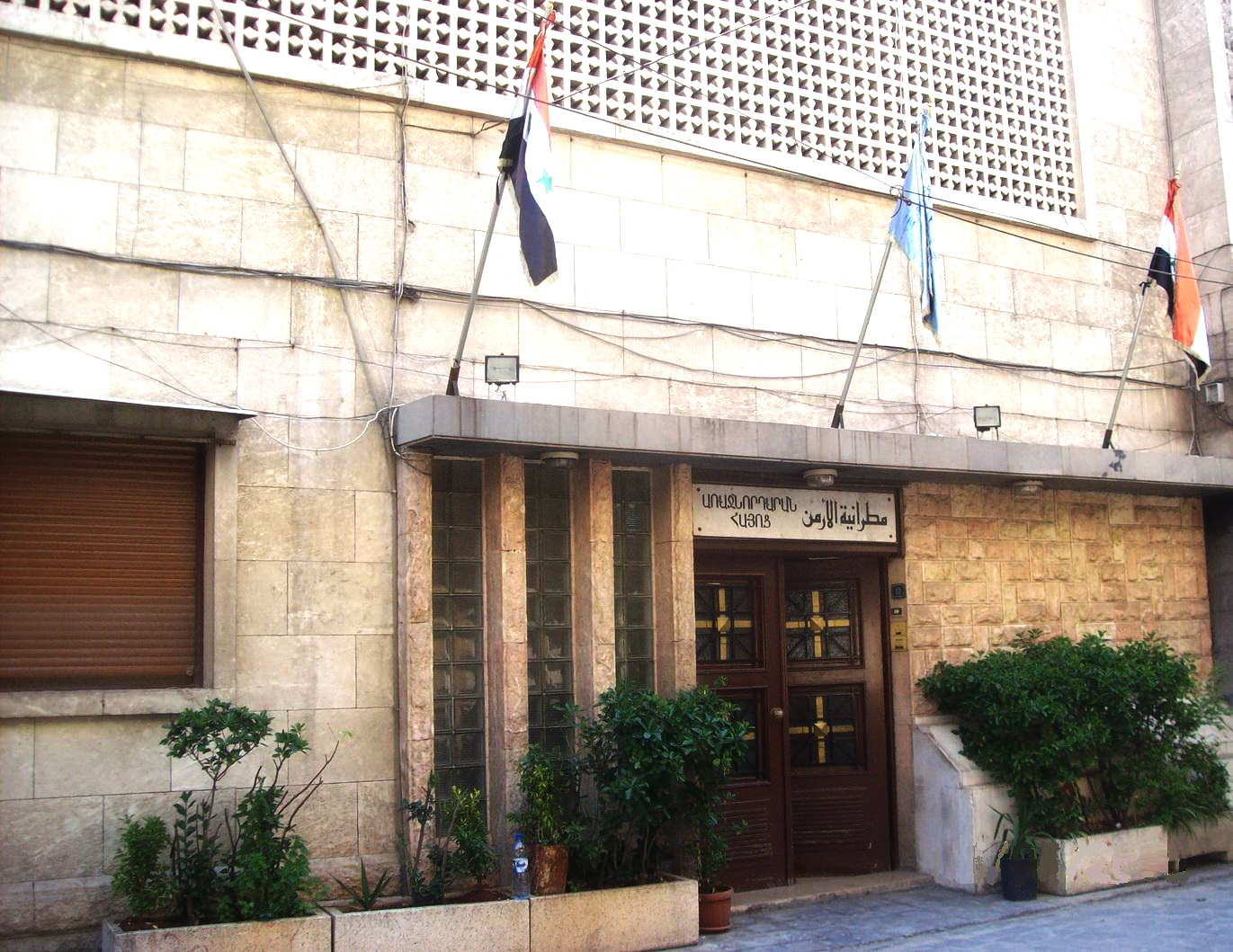
The Armenian prelacy near the cathedral

== See also ==
- List of churches in Aleppo
- Armenian Apostolic Church
- Echmiadzin
- List of Armenian Catholicoi of Cilicia
- Church of the Holy Mother of God (Aleppo)
- Holy See of Cilicia
- Armenian Diocese of Beroea
