= Armenian Genocide Memorial Church, Der Zor =

Church in Syria destroyed by ISIL in 2014

Armenian Genocide Martyrs' Memorial Church
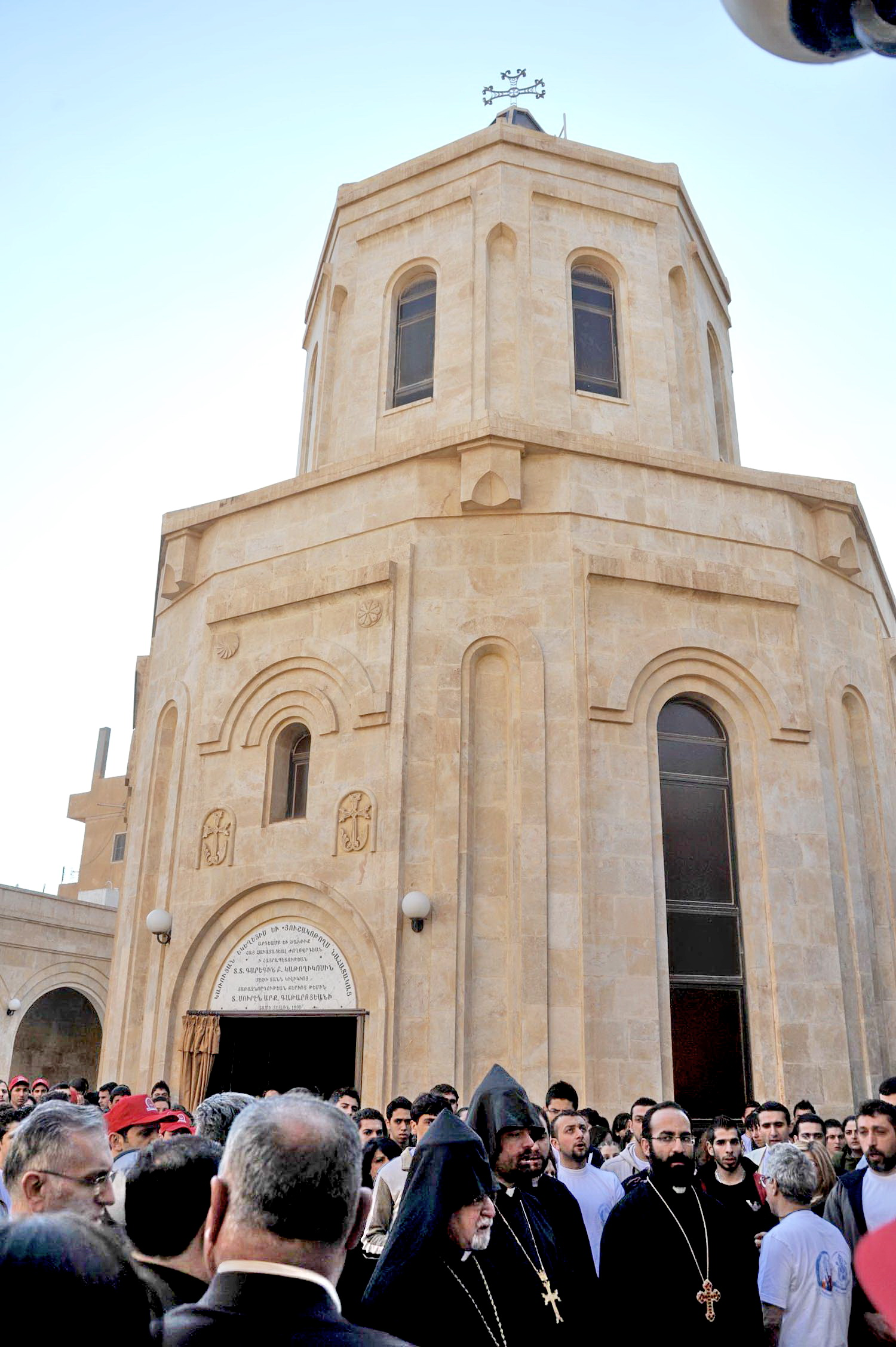

- Location within Syria

Religion
- Affiliation: Armenian Apostolic Church
- Region: Deir ez-Zor
- Year consecrated: 4 May 1991
- Status: Ruined

Location
- Location: Deir ez-Zor, Syria
- Coordinates: 35.3387805°N 40.1417138°E

Architecture
- Architects: Sarkis Balmanougian, Garbis Tovmasian
- Type: Church
- Style: Armenian
- Groundbreaking: 1985
- Completed: 1990
- Destroyed: 2014

The Armenian Genocide Martyrs' Memorial (Armenian: Մեծ Եղեռնի Նահատակաց Յուշահամալիր; Arabic: كنيسة شهداء الأرمن) in Deir ez-Zor, Syria, was a complex dedicated to victims of the Armenian genocide. The construction of the Martyrs' Memorial started in December 1989 and was completed in November 1990. It was consecrated on 4 May 1991 by Catholicos Karekin II of the Armenian Catholicosate of Cilicia. The memorial complex served as church, museum, monument, archive centre and exhibition. It was under the direct administration of the Armenian Prelacy, Diocese of Aleppo. Every year, on 24 April, tens of thousands of Armenian pilgrims from all over the world visited the Deir ez-Zor complex to commemorate the genocide victims, with the presence of their religious leaders.

On 21 September 2014, the memorial complex was blown up, reportedly by members of Islamic State of Iraq and the Levant.

== Background ==
Deir ez-Zor was designated as the final destination point of the Armenian refugees who were driven out from their lands into a long march within the Syrian desert. That point of the desert was the site of the annihilation of the remaining refugees who were forced by the Ottoman Turks to death marches. Those major killing centres in the region came to be known as Deir ez-Zor camps.

The location of the memorial was a plot of land which had been used as a burial site and concentration camp, and site of execution during the genocide. Later, through the efforts of the Armenian community in Deir ez-Zor, a small chapel dedicated to Saint Hripsime was built in the same place. The new memorial complex replaced this older structure. By the initiative of the Armenian Apostolic Church, Diocese of Aleppo, the ground-blessing ceremony took place on 12 May 1985.

The Genocide Memorial was a large, freestanding sculptural work. At its base the remains of genocide victims were buried. The complex consisted of a circular glass display of genocide victims' remains, out of which a white-marble tower was grown, flanked by khachkars (cross-stones).

== The complex ==
=== The Wall of Friendship ===
The architecture of the edifice was designed to immortalize the memory of the innocent martyrs. It consisted of a main entrance, through which one went up to the courtyard with stairs that symbolize the horrible catastrophes and disasters that the Armenian nation was subjected to, but without surrendering to pains, they continued to live proudly and with self-esteem. The facade of the main entrance from inside was decorated with pigeon and crosses to express the struggle and sacrifice to achieve peace. On the right side of the courtyard there was the Wall of Friendship which was decorated with different Arabesque and Armenian-style inscriptions as a kind of symbolic expression of the close ties between these two nations. The two continuously flowing springs on this wall mentioned to the inexhaustible life and donation.

=== The Monument ===
Opposite to the main entrance a huge monument was constructed for the memory of the Armenian martyrs. A cross-stone, which was brought from Armenia, was placed on this monument. In front of the monument, the eternity fire burnt continuously. On both sides, one could see five samples of different Armenian genocide monuments found in the whole world. On the left side of the monument there was the memorial wall which carried a number of cross-stones ornamented with beautiful Armenian decorations.

=== The Church and the Museum ===
The main structure of the complex, the church with its museum, was constructed on the left side of the courtyard. The church pointed upwards to embrace the sky with pride and glory. Underneath the church was a hall from which a huge column, the Column of Resurrection, rose up, passing through the middle of the church. Around the base of the column were the remnants of victims of the genocide, bones that were dug from the Syrian desert, placed to act as a witness of the death marches. The column referred to the struggle and the revival of the Armenian nation. The hall acted as a small museum, containing books, publications and documentary photographs exhibited to narrate the story of the sufferings during the genocide.

== Destruction ==
On 21 September 2014, the memorial complex was blown up. Most reports blamed the destruction on militants belonging to Islamic State of Iraq and the Levant. However, Shahan Sarkisian, Prelate of Aleppo, said that the identity of the perpetrators "is not verified", and pointed out that, unlike other examples of demolitions by Islamic State, there was no attempt to disseminate footage of the destruction. Robert Fisk wrote that fighters from Jabhat al-Nusra appeared to be the culprits. Commenting on this, Sam Hardy pointed out that Islamic State was in control of Der Zor at the time of the memorial's destruction but that it was possible the act was committed by former Jabhat al-Nusra fighters now serving under the flag of Islamic State.

Aram I, Catholicos of the Armenian Catholicosate of the Great House of Cilicia of the Armenian Apostolic Church, condemned the destruction of the Armenian Church in Syria. According to the Catholicos, it was a specifically planned crime aimed against the Church that was dedicated to the memory of the victims of the Armenian Genocide as well as against the museum affiliated with the church. "We view this atrocity, committed in the run-up to the Armenian Genocide centennial and on the 23rd anniversary of Armenia's independence, as an act of barbarism”, said Aram I.

== Gallery ==
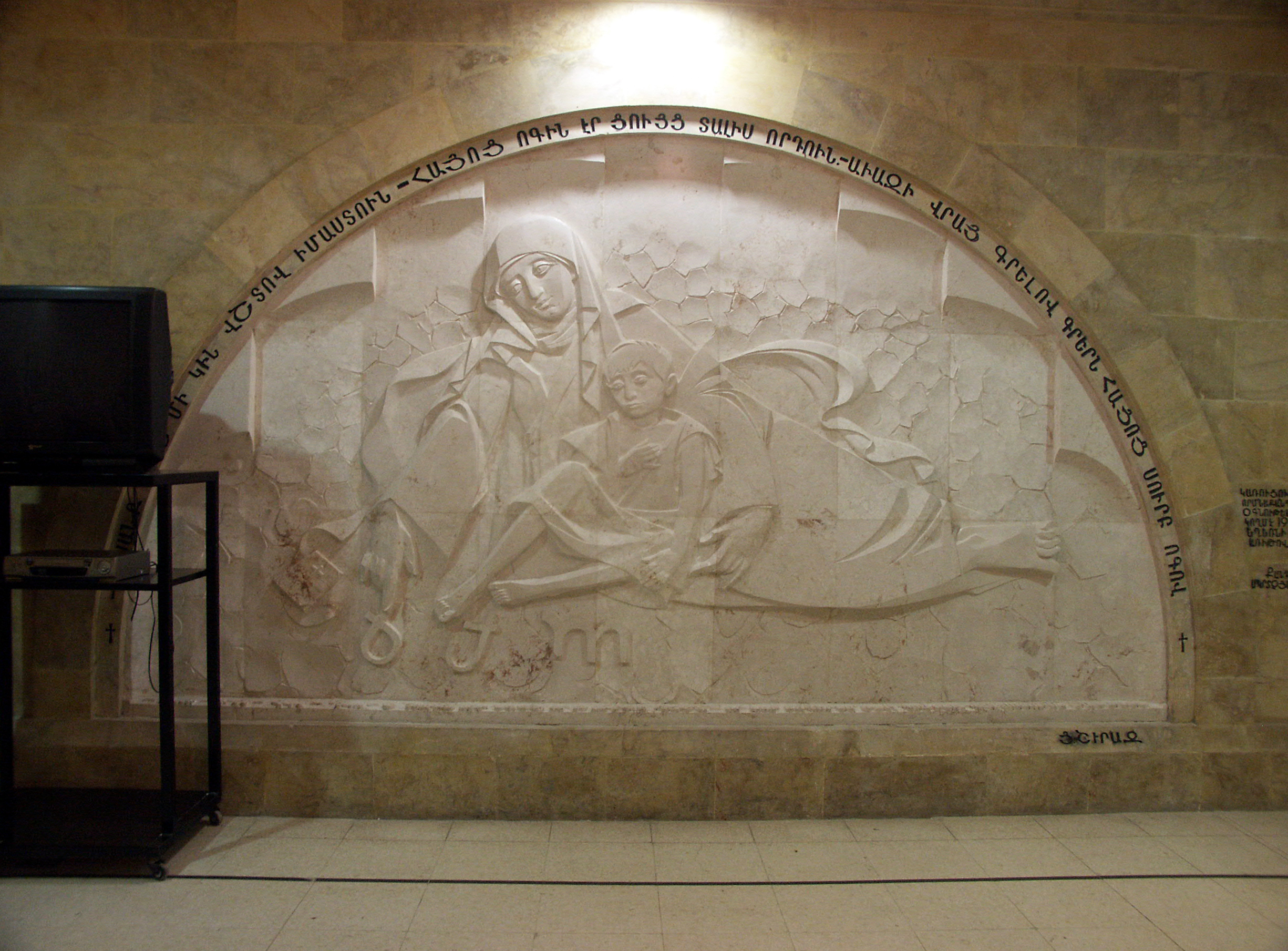
Relief carving inside the museum

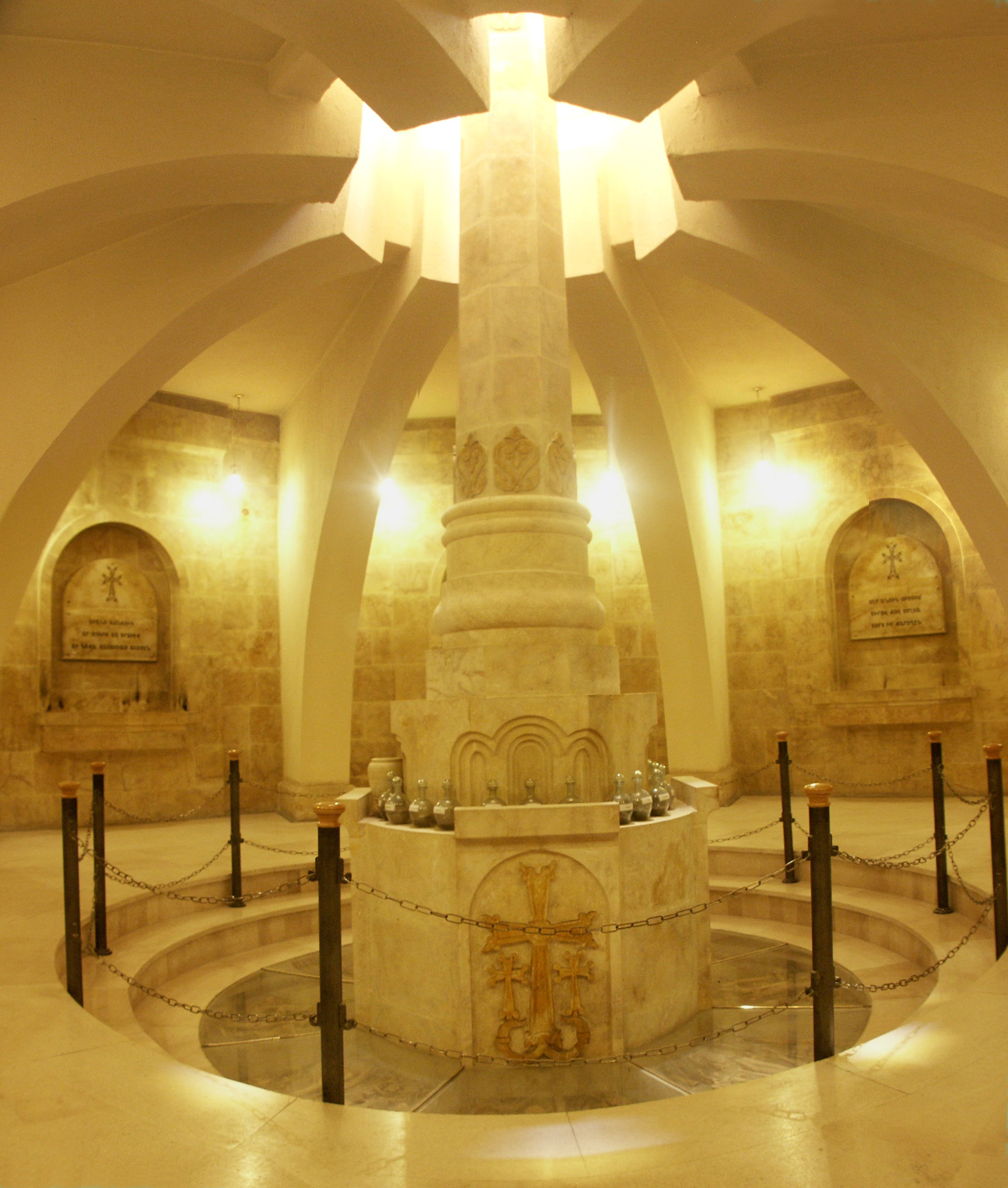
The museum and the Resurrection column with remnants of martyrs around it

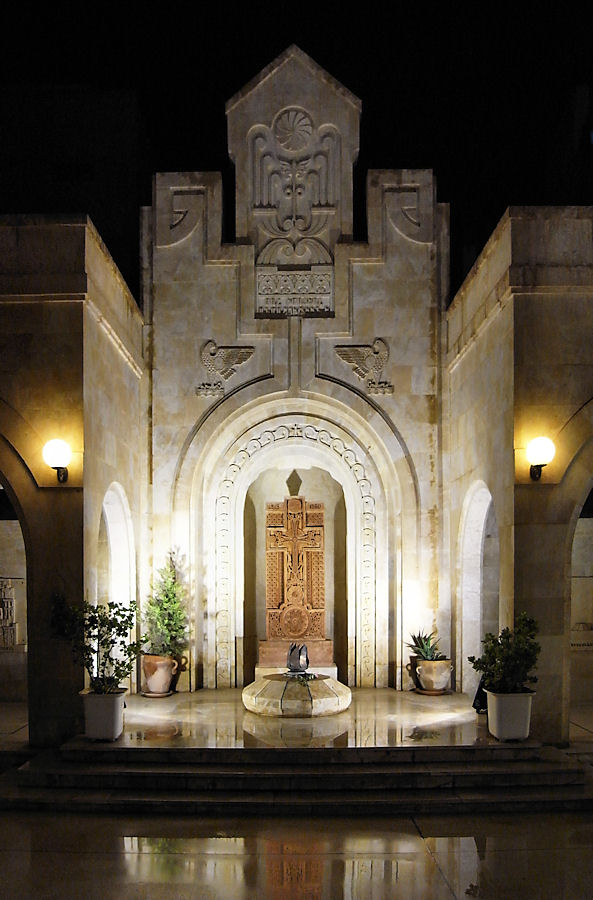
The Monument with the khachkar cross-stone

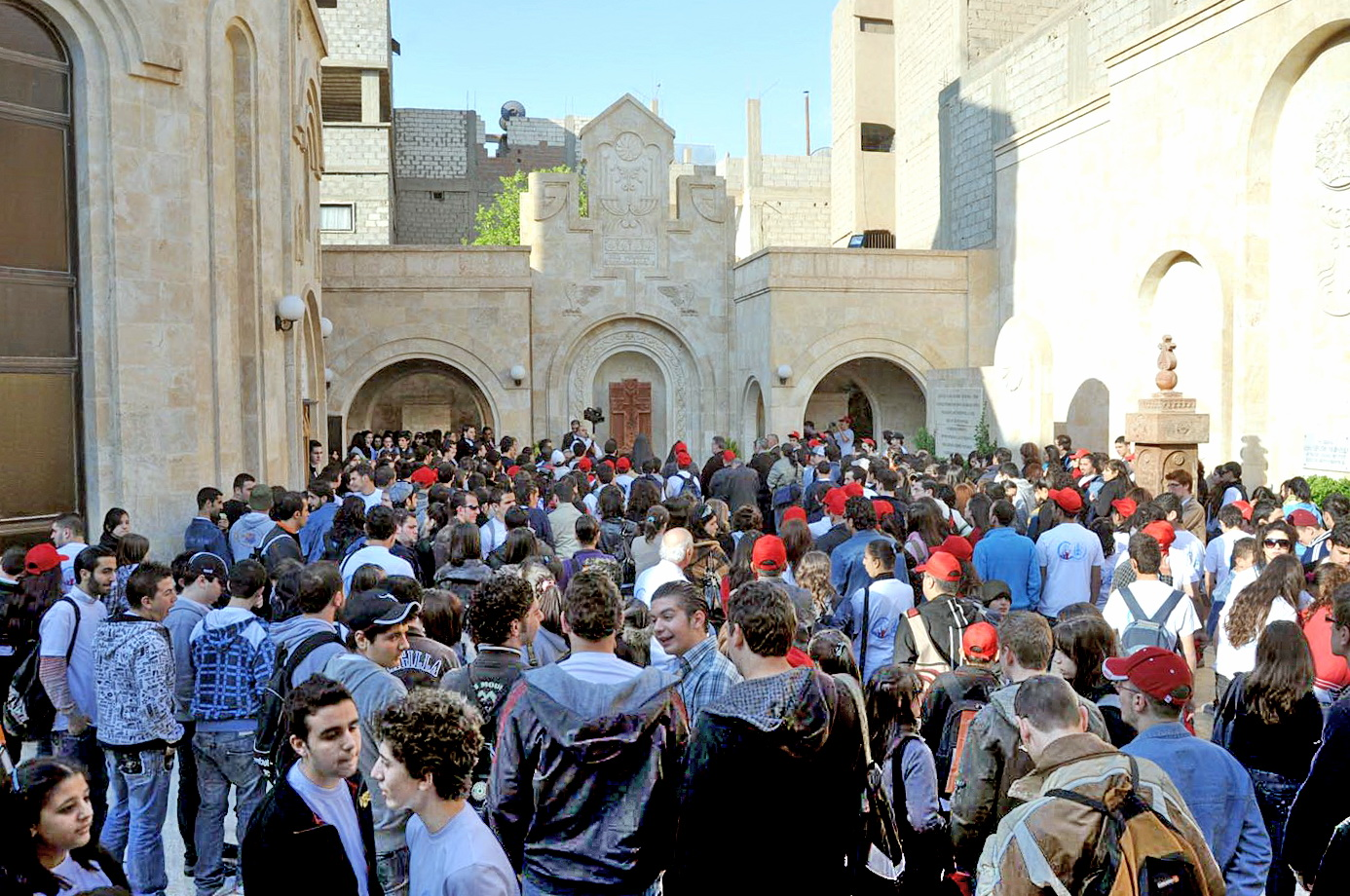
Pilgrims gathered at the memorial

== See also ==
- Deir ez-Zor
- Fadel Al-Aboud
- Haj Fadel Government
- Deir ez-Zor Camps
- Church of the Holy Mother of God (Aleppo)
- Death march
- Holy See of Cilicia
- List of Armenian genocide memorials
- Armenian Apostolic Church
- Armenian genocide
- Armenians in Syria
- Destruction of cultural heritage by the Islamic State
