= Armenian Prelacy of Aleppo =

Armenian Prelacy of Aleppo Բերիոյ թեմ
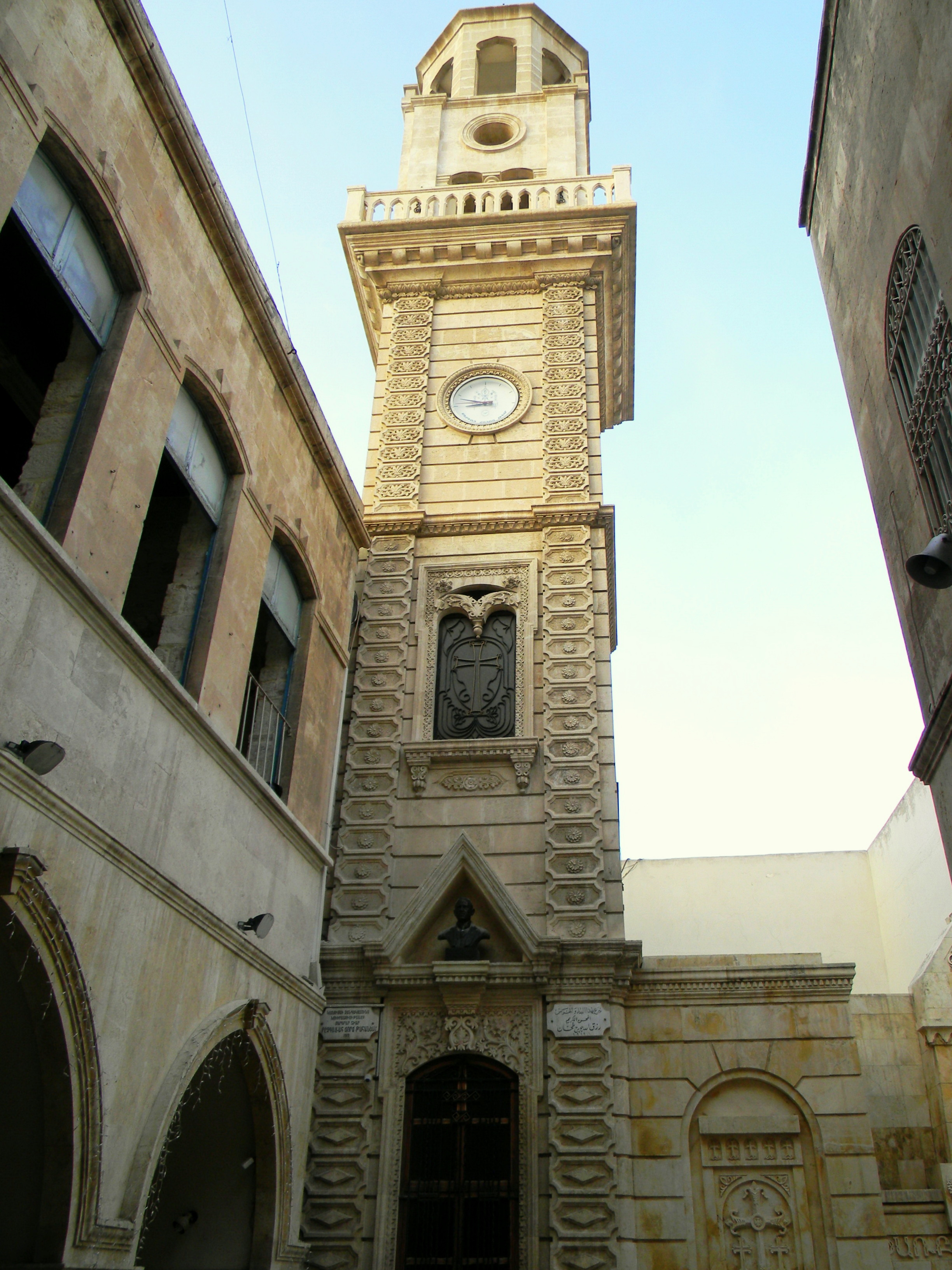
- Forty Martyrs Cathedral, Aleppo

Location
- Country: Syria

Statistics
- Population: Total: (as of 2011 est.); 70,000

Information
- Denomination: Armenian Apostolic Church
- Rite: Armenian Rite
- Established: 1432
- Cathedral: Forty Martyrs Cathedral, Aleppo

Current leadership
- Patriarch: Aram I
- Primate: Archbishop Magar Ashkarian

Website
- Official website

Armenian Prelacy of Aleppo (Armenian: Բերիոյ թեմ Berio Tem), is one of the oldest dioceses of the Armenian Apostolic Church outside the historic Armenian territories, covering the Syrian city of Aleppo and the governorates of Deir ez-Zor, Idlib, Latakia and Raqqa. It is known as Beroea, being named after one of the ancient names of Aleppo; when the city was renamed Beroea (Βέροια) in 301 BC by Seleucus Nicator until the Arab conquest of Syria and Aleppo in 637 AD. The seat of the bishop is the Forty Martyrs Cathedral of Aleppo. It is under the jurisdiction of the Holy See of Cilicia of the Armenian Church.

== History ==
The presence of Armenians in northern Syria dates back to the 1st century BC. Under Tigranes the Great, Armenians invaded Syria and the city of Antioch was chosen as one of the four capitals of the short-lived Armenian Empire.

In the Middle Ages, Armenia was conquered by the Arab Islamic Caliphate during the first half of the 7th century. Thousands of Armenians were carried into slavery by the Arab invaders to serve in other regions of the Umayyad Caliphate including the Muslim-controlled Syria.

Another wave of Armenian migrants arrived in Cilicia and northern Syria during the 2nd half of the 11th century, when Armenia was conquered by the Seljuq Turks. Most Armenians established themselves in Cilicia where they founded the Armenian Kingdom of Cilicia. Many other Armenians have preferred to settle in northern Syria. Armenian quarters were formed during the 11th century in Antioch, Aleppo, Ayntab, Marash, Kilis, etc.

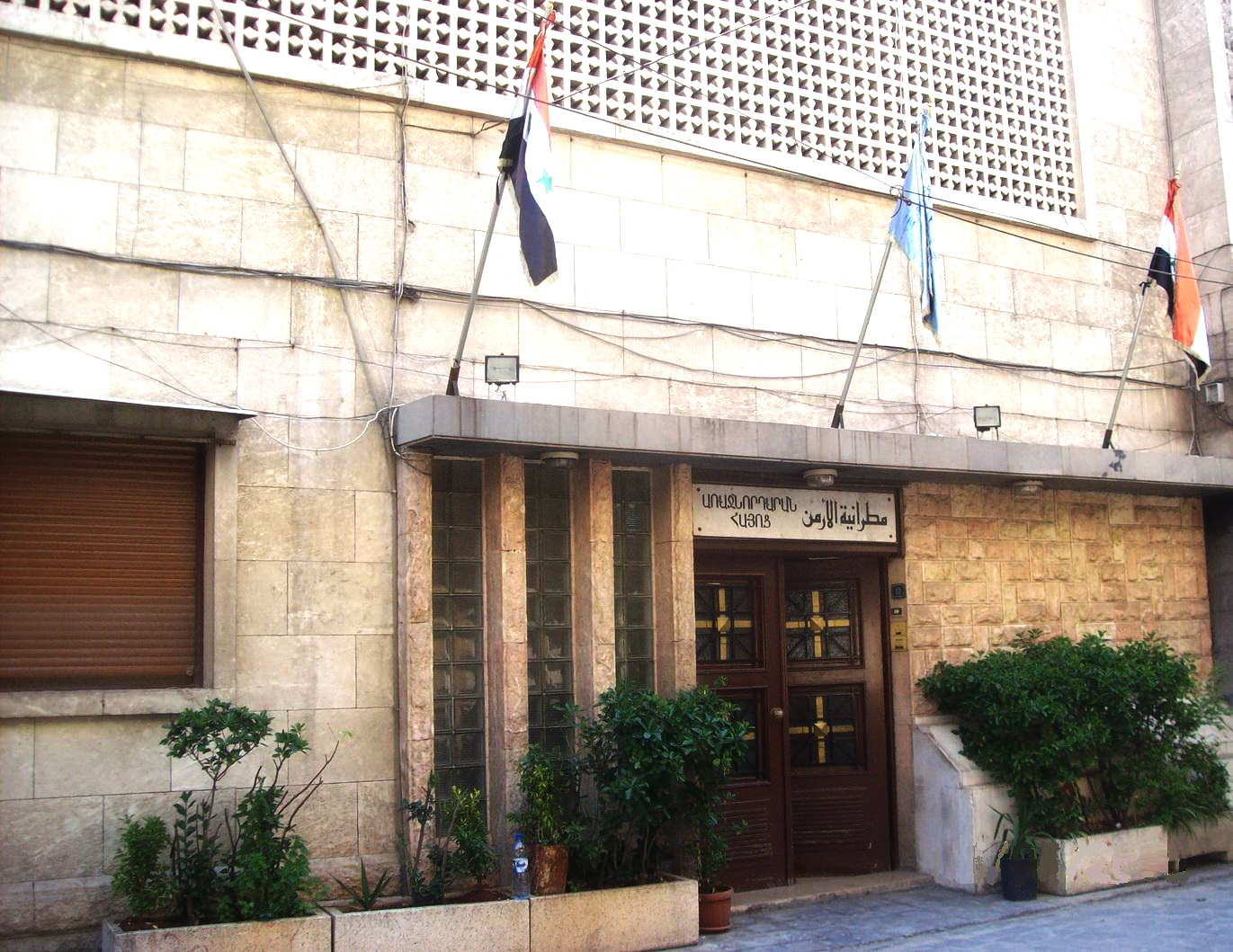
The prelacy building in Aleppo

However, the Armenian population of Syria and its surrounding areas has greatly diminished after the invasion of the Mongols under Hulagu Khan in 1260.

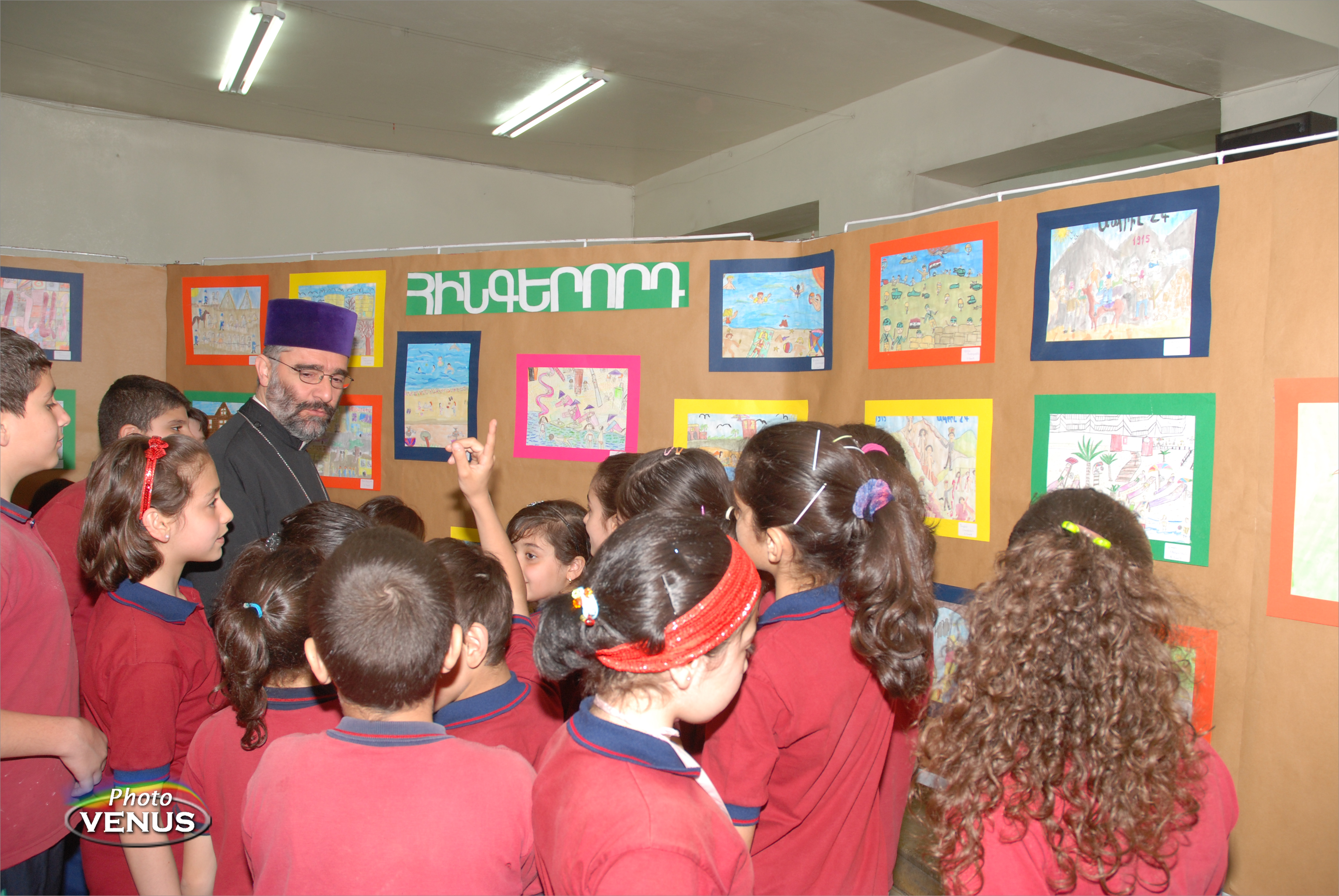
Former Archbishop Shahan Sarkisian surrounded with school children

After the decline of the Armenian Kingdom of Cilicia during the 14th century, a new wave of Armenian migrants from the Cilician and other towns of northern Syria arrived in Aleppo. They have gradually developed their own schools and churches to become a well-organized community during the 15th century.

The Armenian Prelacy of Aleppo was founded in 1432 in Aleppo by the Great House of Cilicia. Hovakim of Beroea became the first bishop of Aleppo, serving as primate of the Prelacy between 1432 and 1442.

The estimated population of the prelacy all over Syria was around 70,000 Armenians before the breakout of the Syrian Civil War.

== Active churches ==
Here is the list of churches in Syria functioning under the jurisdiction of the Prelacy of Aleppo, along with their location and year of consecration:

- Forty Martyrs Cathedral, Aleppo, 1491
- Saint Gregory the Illuminator's Church, Aleppo, 1933
- Surp Hagop Church, Aleppo, 1943
- Saint George's Church, Aleppo, 1965 (interior burnt by the Free Syrian Army during the Syrian Civil War)
- Church of the Holy Mother of God, Aleppo, 1983
- Holy Mother of God Church, Latakia, 1755 (as Surp Hagop), rebuilt in the 1940s and renamed after the Holy Mother of God
- Holy Mother of God Church, Kessab, unknown, renovated in 1880
- Holy Mother of God Church of Karadouran, Kessab, 1890, rebuilt in 2009
- Surp Anna Church, Yakubiyah village, 1380, under the control of Jabhat al-Nusra since 2012
- Surp Hripsime Church, Yakubiyah village, 1963, under the control of Jabhat al-Nusra since 2012
- Saint George's Church, Ghnemiyeh village, 1st half of the 18th century, renovated in 1875 (damaged by the Syrian Turkmen Brigades)
- Surp Stepanos Church, Aramo village, 1310 (damaged by the Syrian Turkmen Brigades)
- Holy Cross Church, Tell Abyad, 1932 (damaged by the Islamic State of Iraq and the Levant)
- Armenian Genocide Martyrs' Memorial Church, Deir ez-Zor, 1991, (almost entirely destroyed by the Islamic State of Iraq and the Levant)
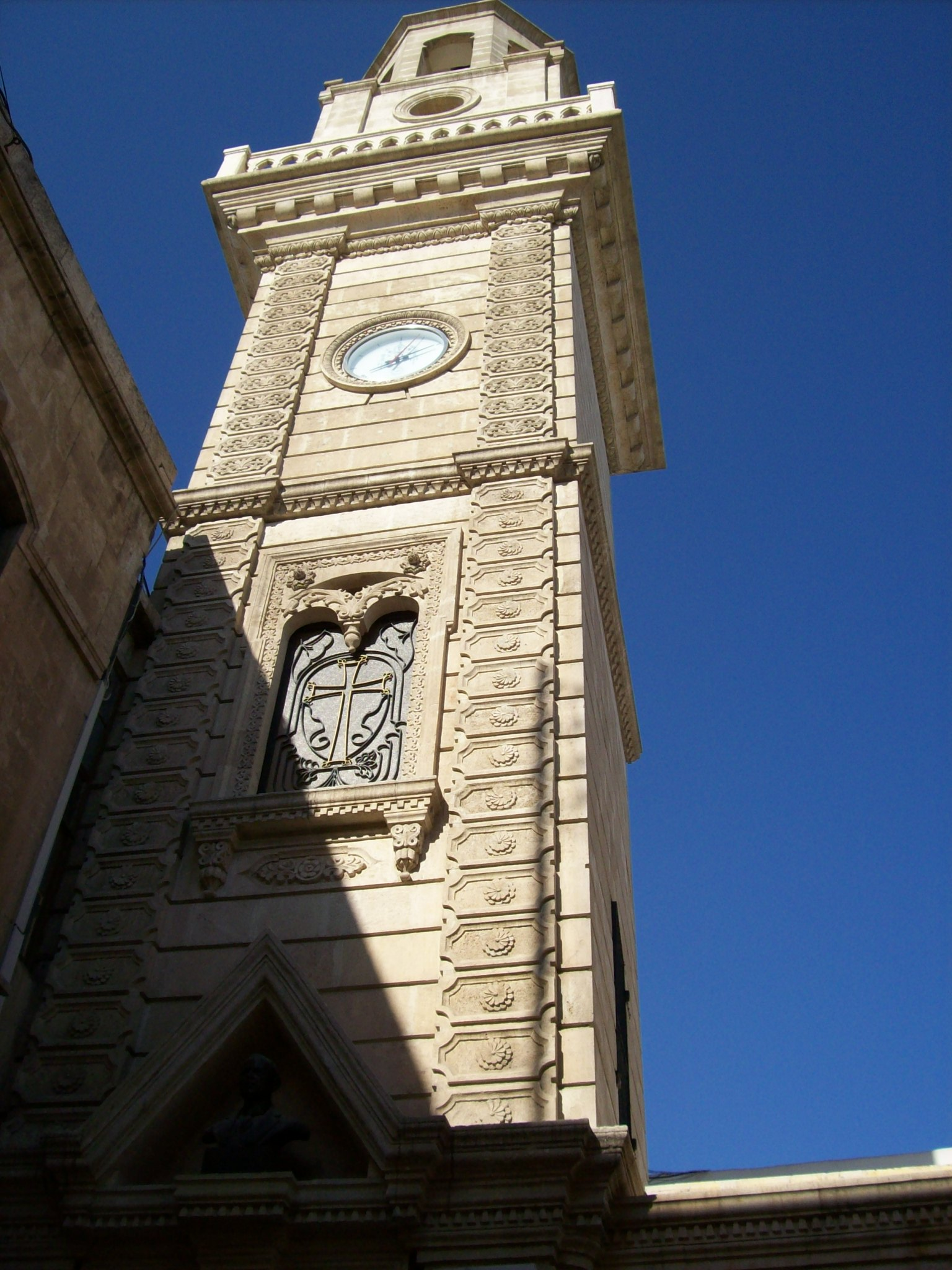
Forty Martyrs Cathedral, Aleppo, 1491

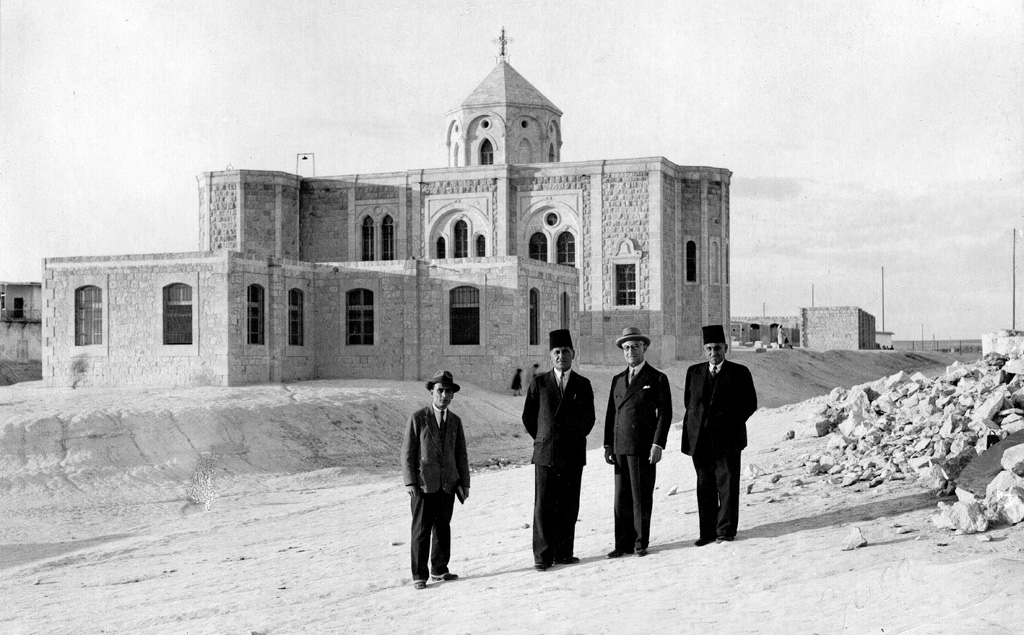
Saint Gregory the Illuminator's Church, Aleppo

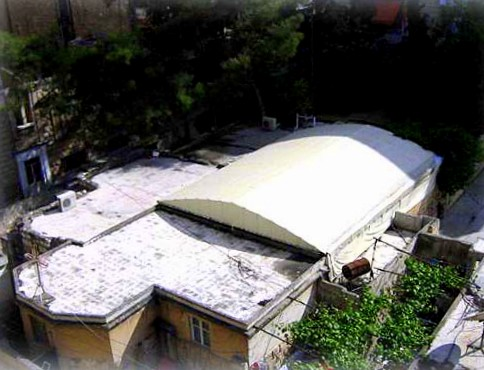
Surp Hagop Church, Aleppo, 1943

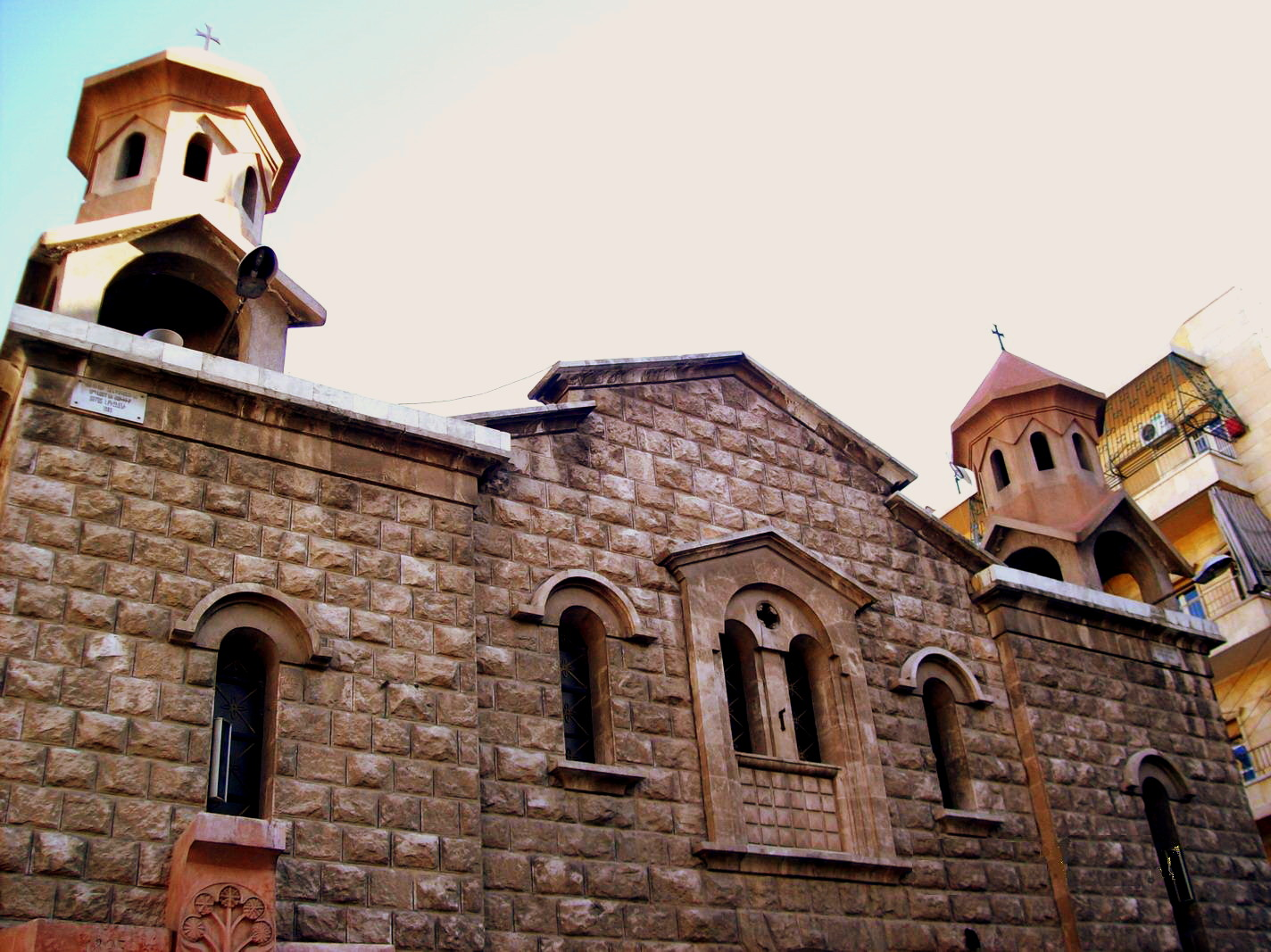
Saint George's Church, Aleppo, 1965

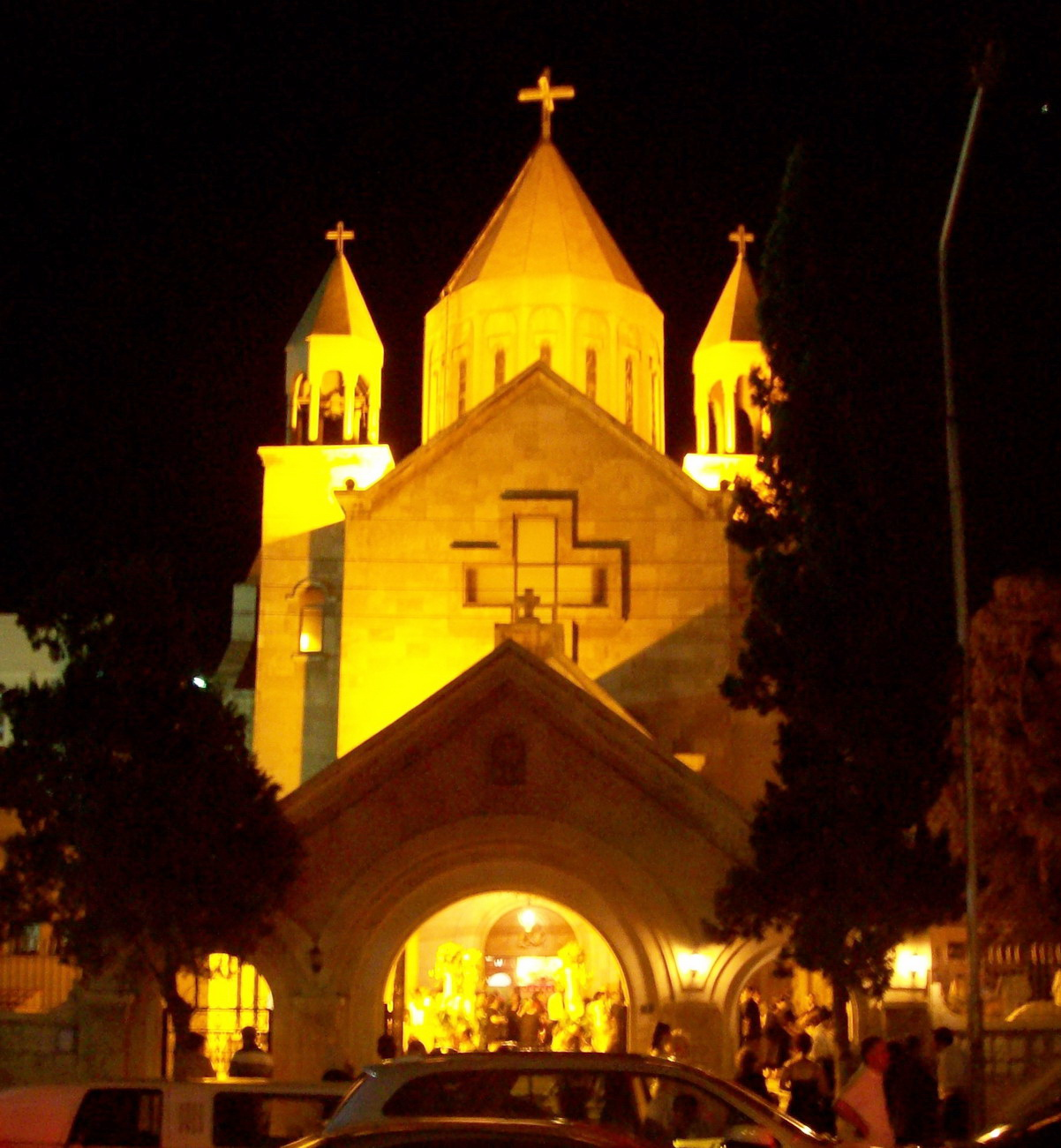
Church of the Holy Mother of God, Aleppo, 1983

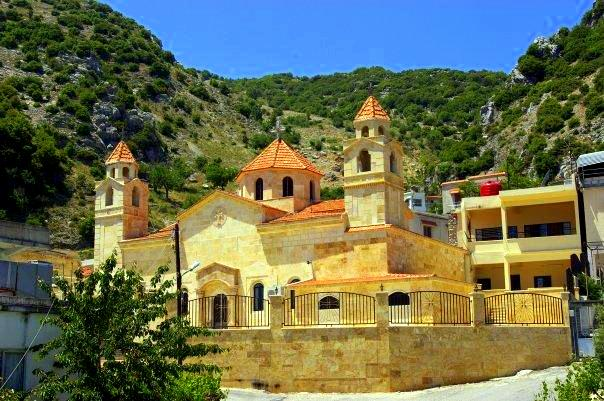
Holy Mother of God Church, Kessab, unknown, renovated in 1880

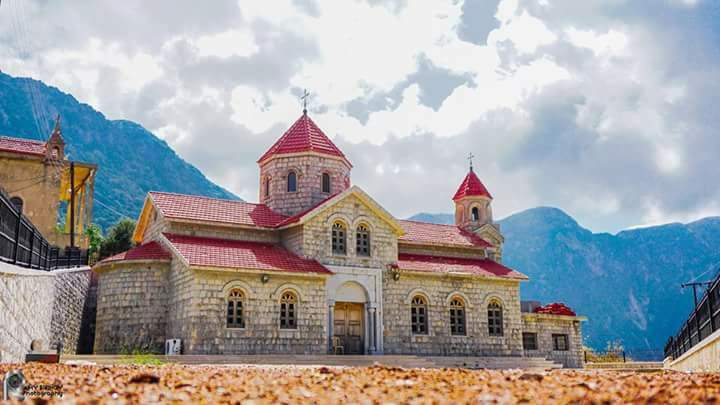
Holy Mother of God Church of Karadouran, Kessab, 1890, rebuilt in 2009

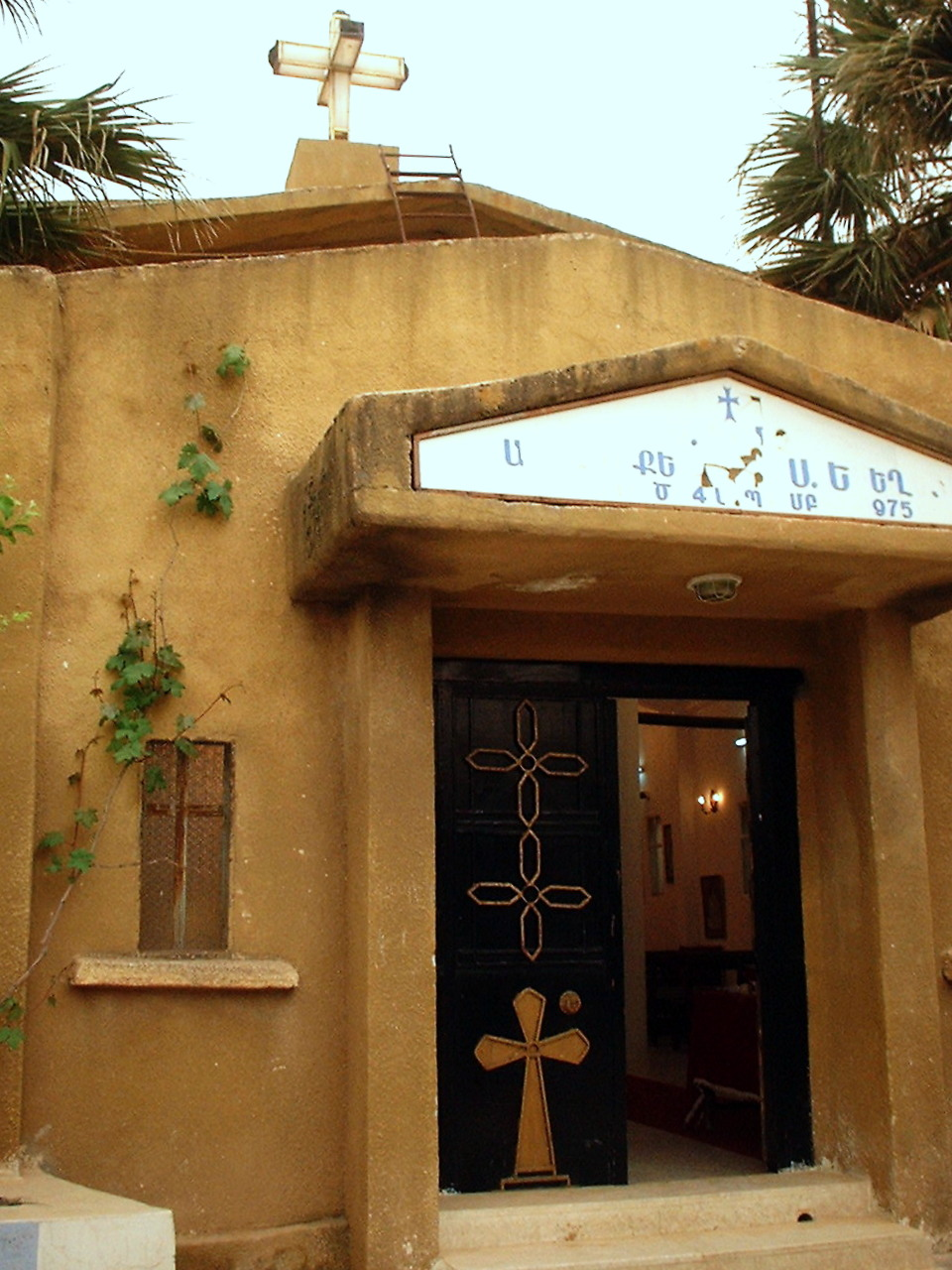
Holy Cross Church, Tell Abyad, 1932

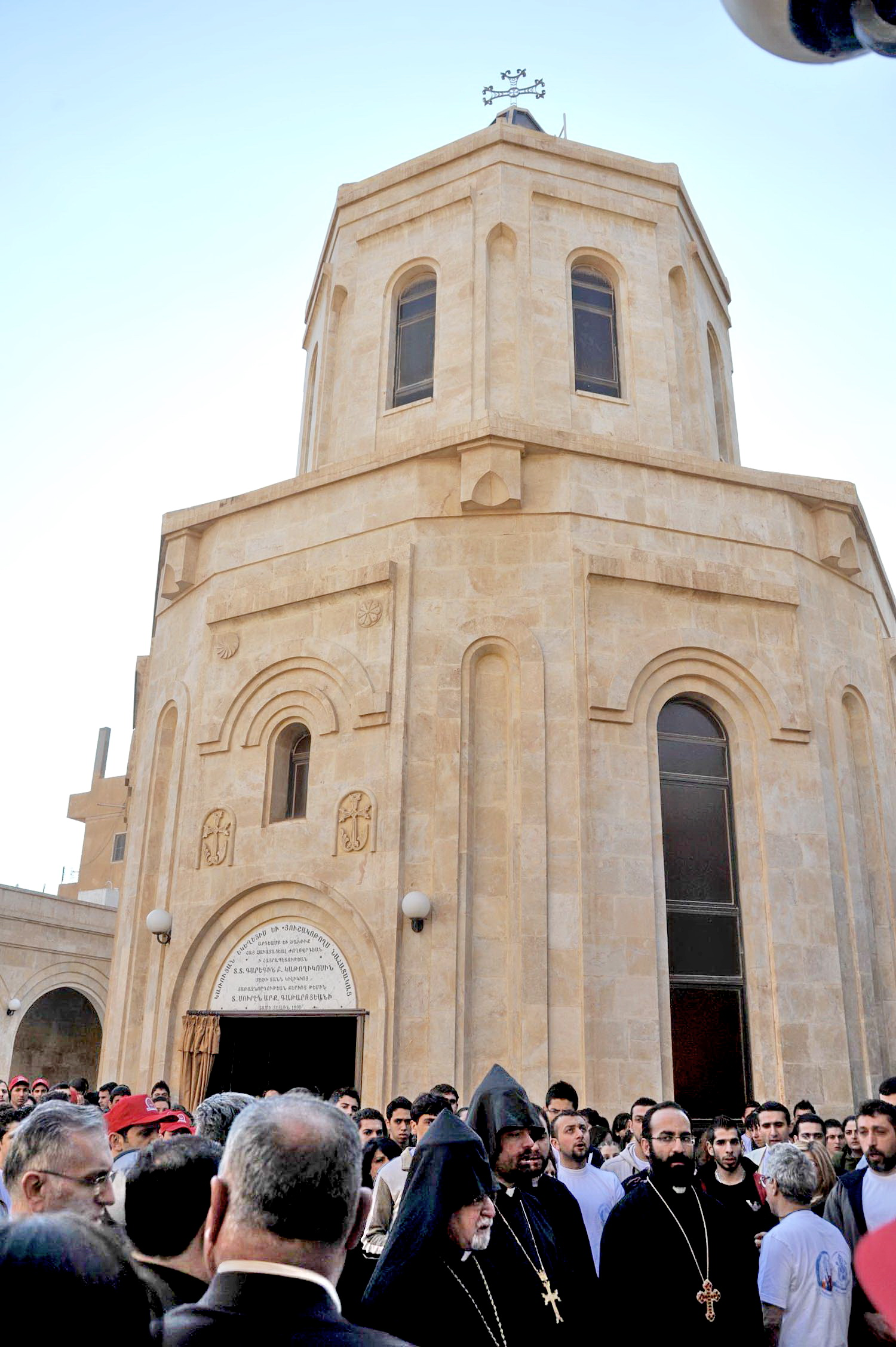
Armenian Genocide Martyrs' Memorial Church, Deir ez-Zor, 1991

=== Chapels ===
- Surp Stepanos Chapel of Karadouran, Kessab, 909
- Virgin Mary's Chapel of Esguran, Kessab, 1940s
- Holy Resurrection Chapel, Markada village, 1995 (under the control of the Islamic State of Iraq and the Levant)
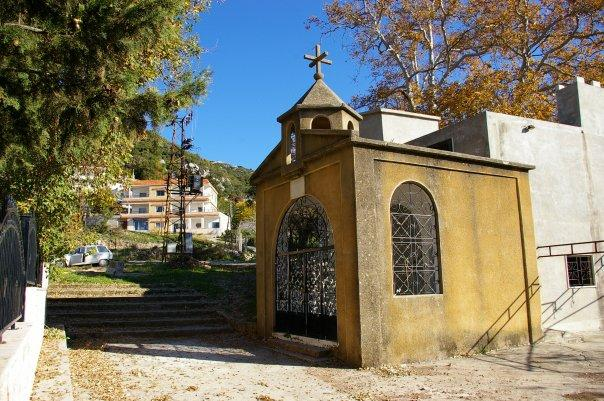
Virgin Mary's Chapel of Esguran, Kessab, 1940s

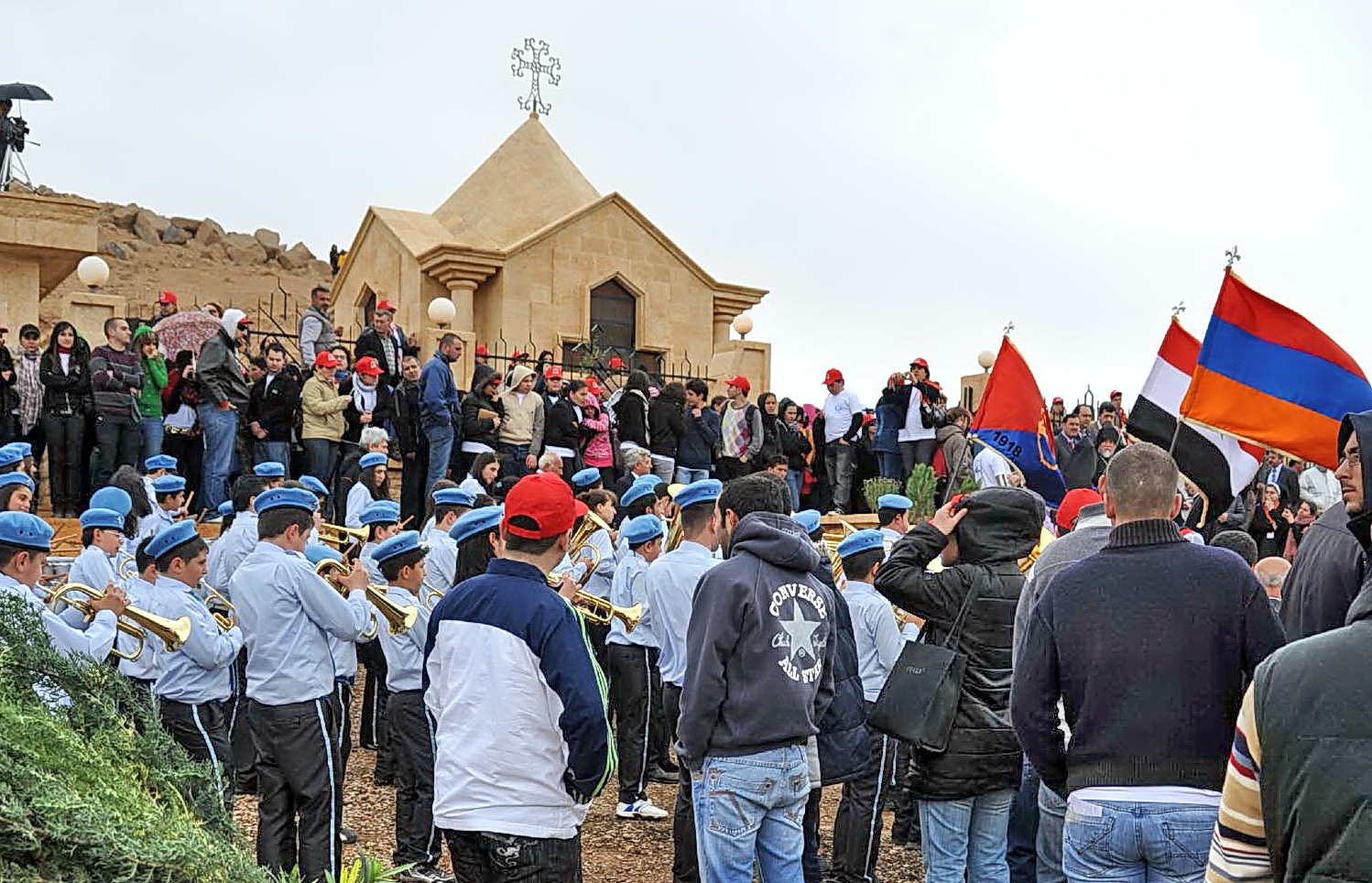
Holy Resurrection Chapel, Markada, 1995
