= Surp Hagop Church =

Church in Aleppo, Syria

Church of Saint Jacob of Nisibis Սուրբ Յակոբ Եկեղեցի
- كنيسة القديس يعقوب
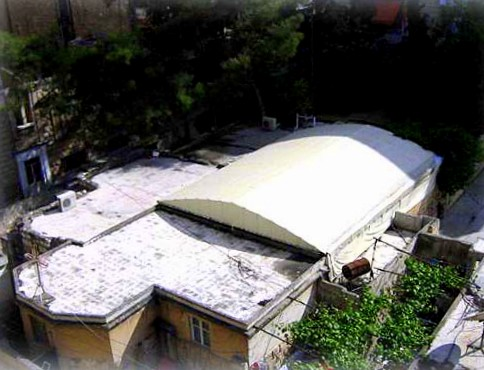
- Aerial view of the church of Saint Jacob of Nisibis

- Location in Aleppo

Religion
- Affiliation: Armenian Apostolic Church, Diocese of Beroea
- Region: Aleppo
- Ecclesiastical or organisational status: active
- Year consecrated: 1943

Location
- Location: Old Syriac (Assyrian) Quarter, Aleppo, Syria
- Coordinates: 36.2173°N 37.1452°E

Architecture
- Type: Church
- Style: Single-nave basilica with no dome
- Groundbreaking: 1934

Surp Hagop Church (Armenian: Սուրբ Յակոբ Եկեղեցի); also Saint Jacob or Saint James, is a small Armenian Apostolic church, located on al-Iman street in the Old Syriac (Assyrian) quarter of Aleppo, Syria. It was opened in 1943 and later enlarged in 1962.

== Overview ==
The ground blessing ceremony of this small church took place on 3 June 1934, during the period of Archbishop Ardavazt Surmeyan of the Armenian Diocese of Beroea, on a piece of land occupying around 750 square meters, donated by the Italian General Consul of Aleppo, Georgio Marcopolli. However, the construction process started only in 1940, with the erection of a small building. The consecration of the church took place in 1943 with the presence of the community leaders. The church was named in the honour of Saint Jacob of Nisibis.

The current shape of the church dates back to 1962, after a major enlargement process. Surrounded with a small yard, the church is still without dome and belfry.

In 1988–89, the church has been completely renovated by the Armenian Diocese of Beroea.

== Gallery ==
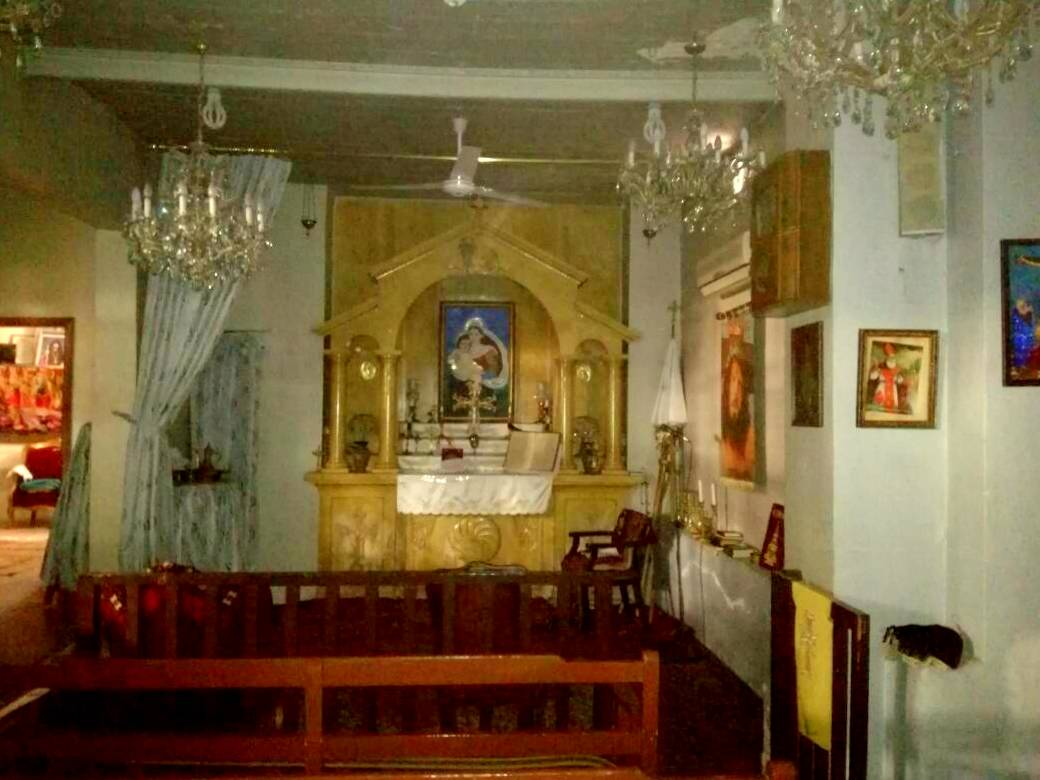
The main altar

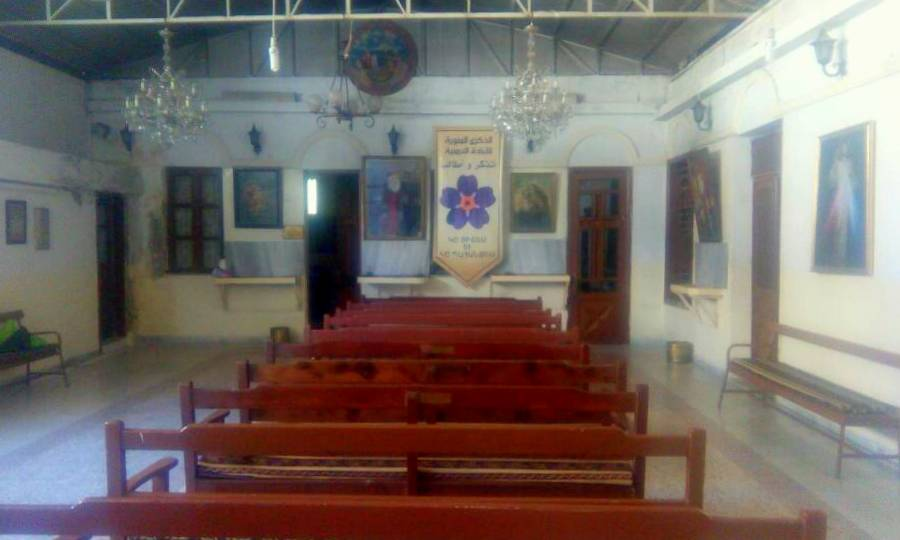
Inside the church, April 2017
