= Aleppo school =

School of icon-painting

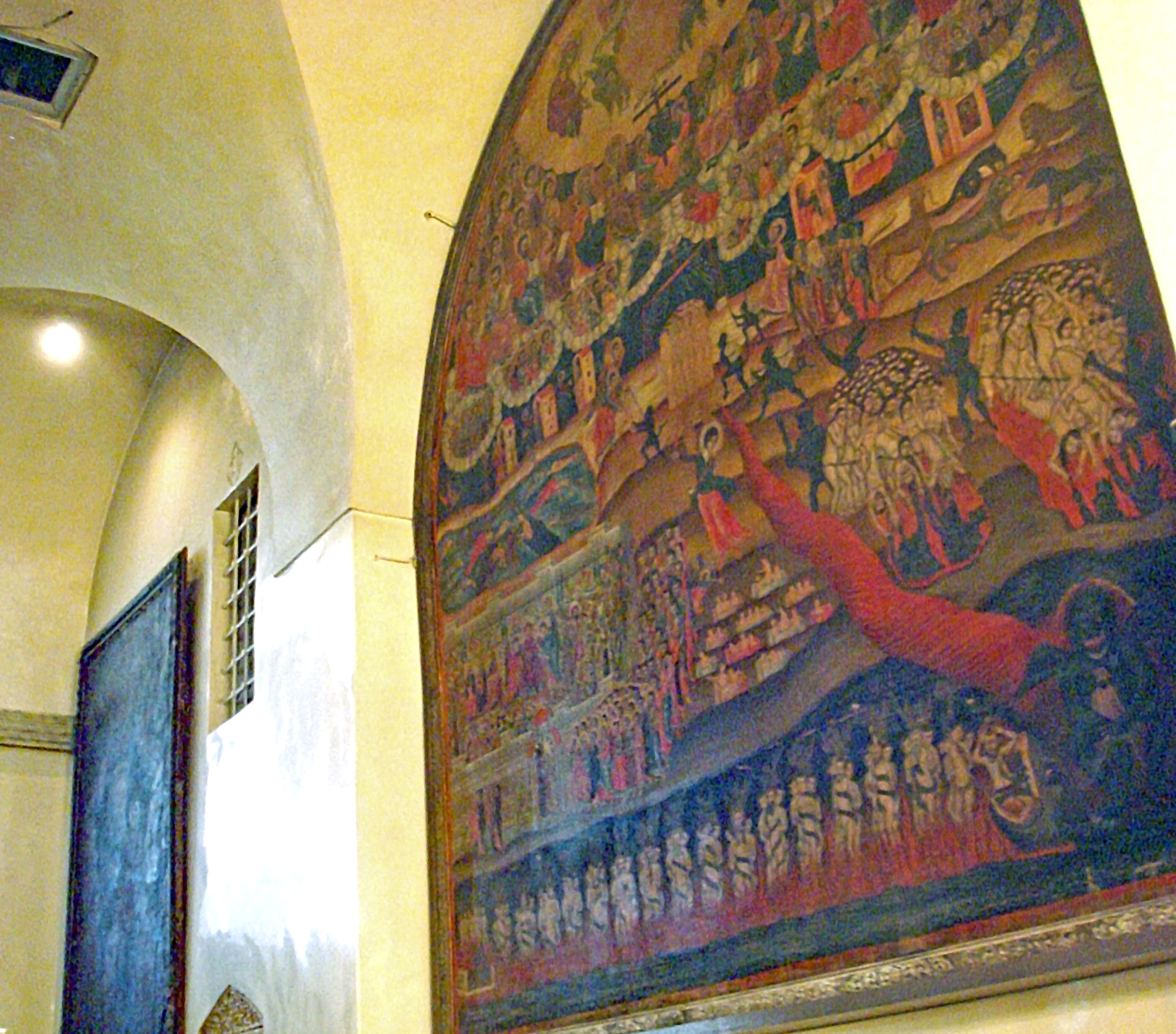
The Last Judgement by Nehmatallah Hovsep (1703)

The Aleppo school was a school of icon painting, founded by the priest Yusuf al-Musawwir (also known as Joseph the Painter) and active in Aleppo, which was then a part of the Ottoman Empire, between at least 1645 and 1777. As explained by William Lyster:

[al-Musawwir's] atelier drew upon the icon tradition of Crete, which before its conquest by the Ottomans in 1699 was the "hub of a great intermingling of Western and Eastern Christian representations."

The Last Judgement, painted by Nehmatallah Hovsep in 1703, is one of the most famous icons of the Aleppo school.

== Sources ==
- Lyster, William, ed. (2008). The Cave Church of Paul the Hermit at the Monastery of St. Paul in Egypt. Yale University Press.
- Immerzeel, Mat (2005). "The Wall Paintings in the Church of Mar Elian at Homs: A 'Restoration Project' of a Nineteenth-Century Palestinian Master". Eastern Christian Art. 2. doi:10.2143/ECA.2.0.2004557.
