= Church of the Holy Mother of God (Aleppo) =

Armenian Apostolic church in Aleppo, Syria

Church of the Holy Mother of God Սուրբ Աստուածածին Եկեղեցի كنيسة السيدة العذراء مريم
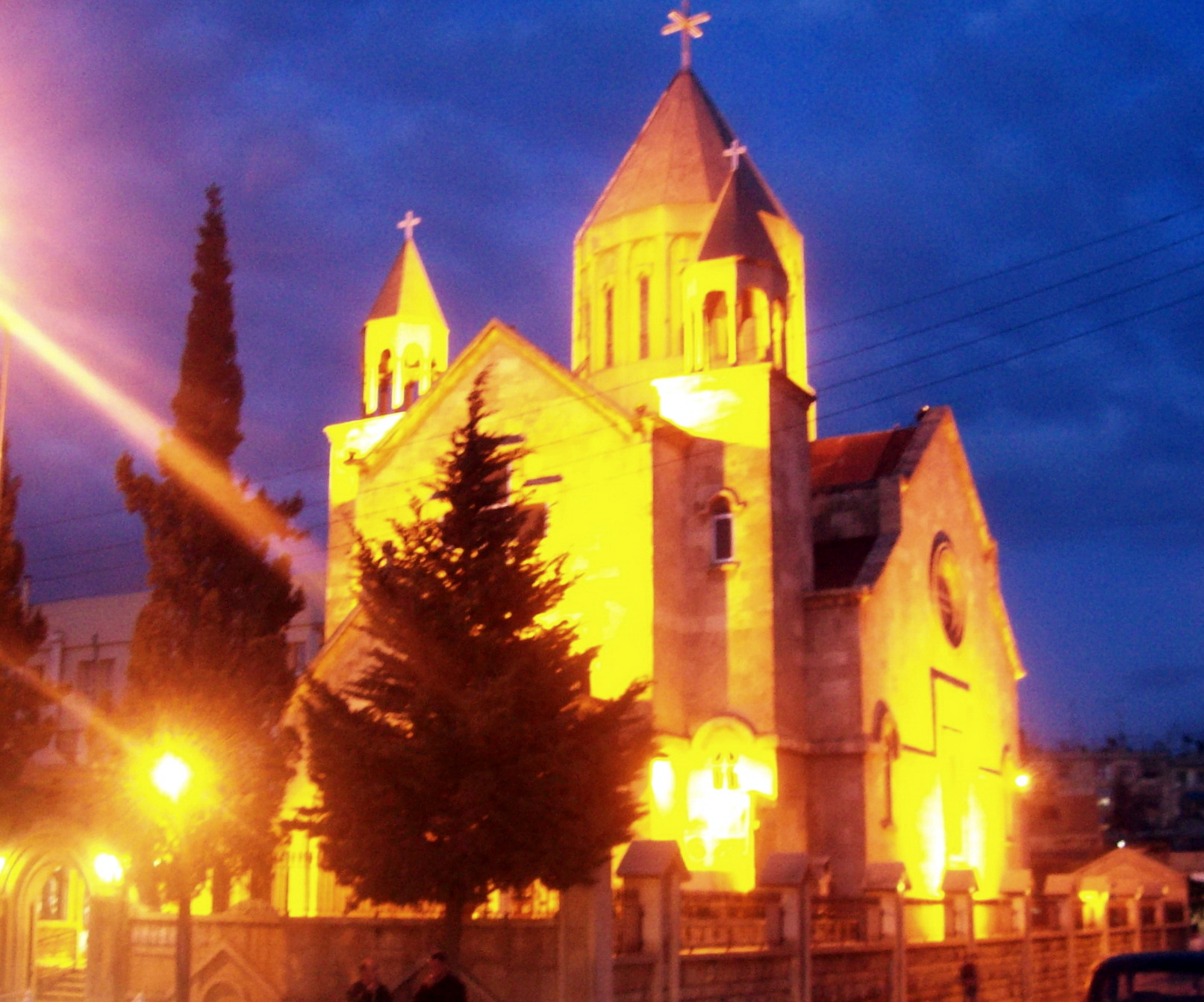

- Location in Aleppo

Religion
- Affiliation: Armenian Apostolic Church, Diocese of Beroea
- Region: Aleppo
- Ecclesiastical or organisational status: active
- Year consecrated: 1 May 1983

Location
- Location: Suleimaniyeh Area, Elias IV Patriarch Street, Aleppo, Syria
- Coordinates: 36.2198°N 37.1587°E

Architecture
- Architects: Kevork Karajerjian (Lebanon), Kegham Khrigian
- Type: Church
- Style: Armenian
- Groundbreaking: 1972

Church of the Holy Mother of God (Armenian: Սուրբ Աստուածածին Եկեղեցի; Arabic: كنيسة السيدة العذراء مريم), is an Armenian Apostolic church located in the Sulaimaniyeh district of Aleppo, Syria. The church is active since its consecration on May 1 May 1983, by then-Catholicos of the Holy See of Cilicia Karekin II.

== Background ==
The current church of the Holy Mother of God is considered the continuation of the historic church of the Holy Mother of God of the old Christian Jdeydeh quarter, which was opened in 1429 and operated until the beginnings of the 20th century, within the courtyard of the Forty Martyrs Cathedral of Aleppo, when it was turned into a library and recently to the Zarehian Museum in 1991.

== History ==
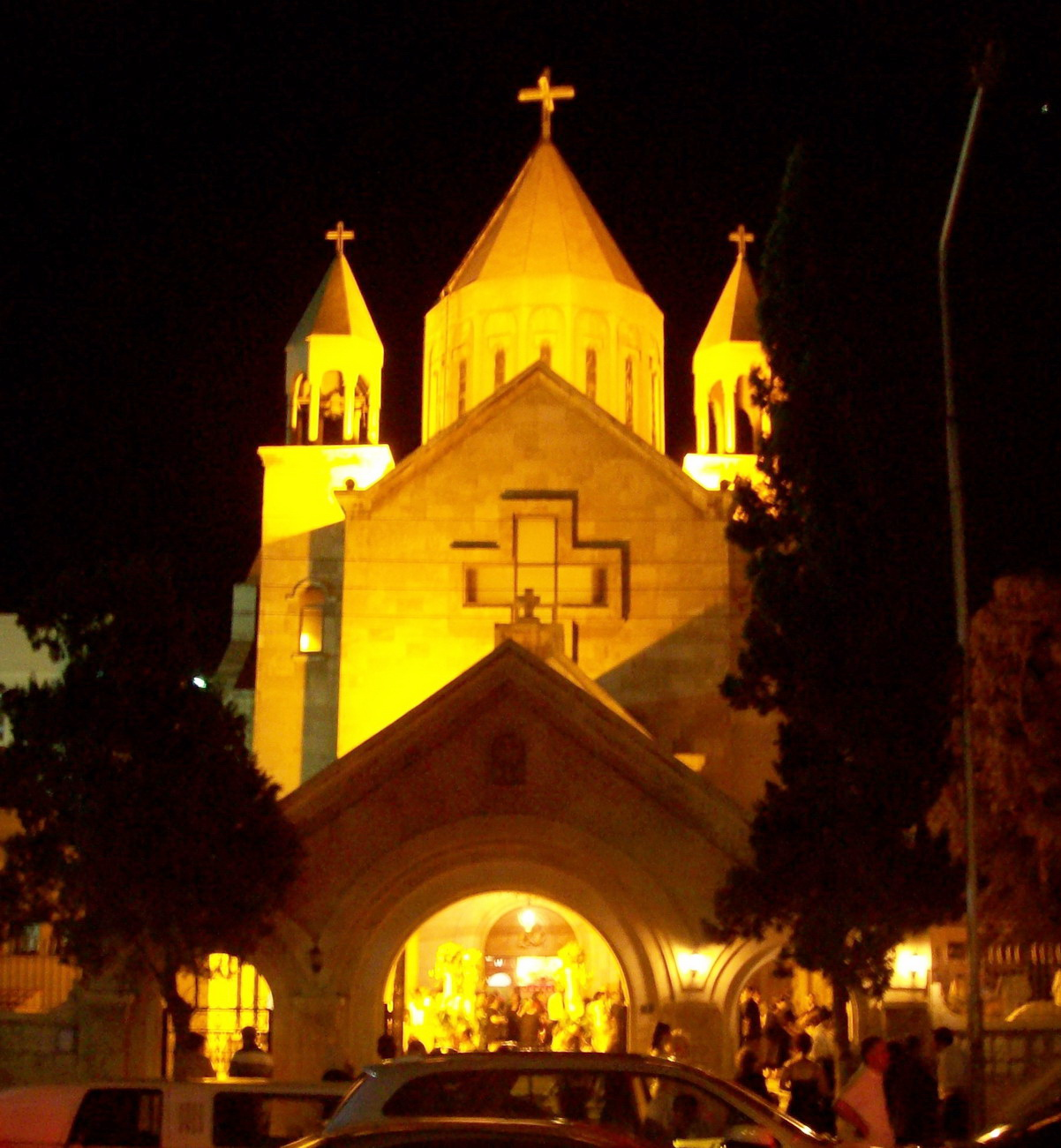
The church at night

The absence of a church to serve the large Armenian community of the Suleimaniyeh area of Aleppo, arose the idea of building a new church, which became true with the donations of Armenian benefactors, especially those whose roots were from the Cilician city of Aintab (nowadays Gaziantep) and throughout the efforts of father Zarmayr Hindoyan, the spiritual leader of Aintabian Armenians in Aleppo.

In 1617, according to Simeon of Poland, the church, together with the Church of the Forty Martyrs, was renovated and enlarged by Khoja Sanos.

The ground-blessing ceremony took place on 10 September 1972 with the presence of Khoren I, Catholicos of the Holy See of Cilicia, during the period of Bishop Datev Sarkissian. The construction work was finished completely in 1982. The consecration ceremony took place on 1 May 1983 under the patronage of Karekin II.

Nowadays, the church itself plays a big role in the life of the Armenians of Aleppo. It is usually crowded with the faithful during regular Sunday masses. Many Armenians are members of the church.

The church has a large hall opened in 1987 with a stage downstairs, used for cultural meetings, concerts, seminars and celebrations.

In 1993 a Khachkar-memorial by Sarkis Balmanougian was erected in the right side of the main entrance of the church, to commemorate the victims of the Armenian genocide. The church was completely renovated in 1998.

Adjacent to the church is the Armenian Gertasirats High School and the Zohrab Kaprielian Theatre.

== Gallery ==
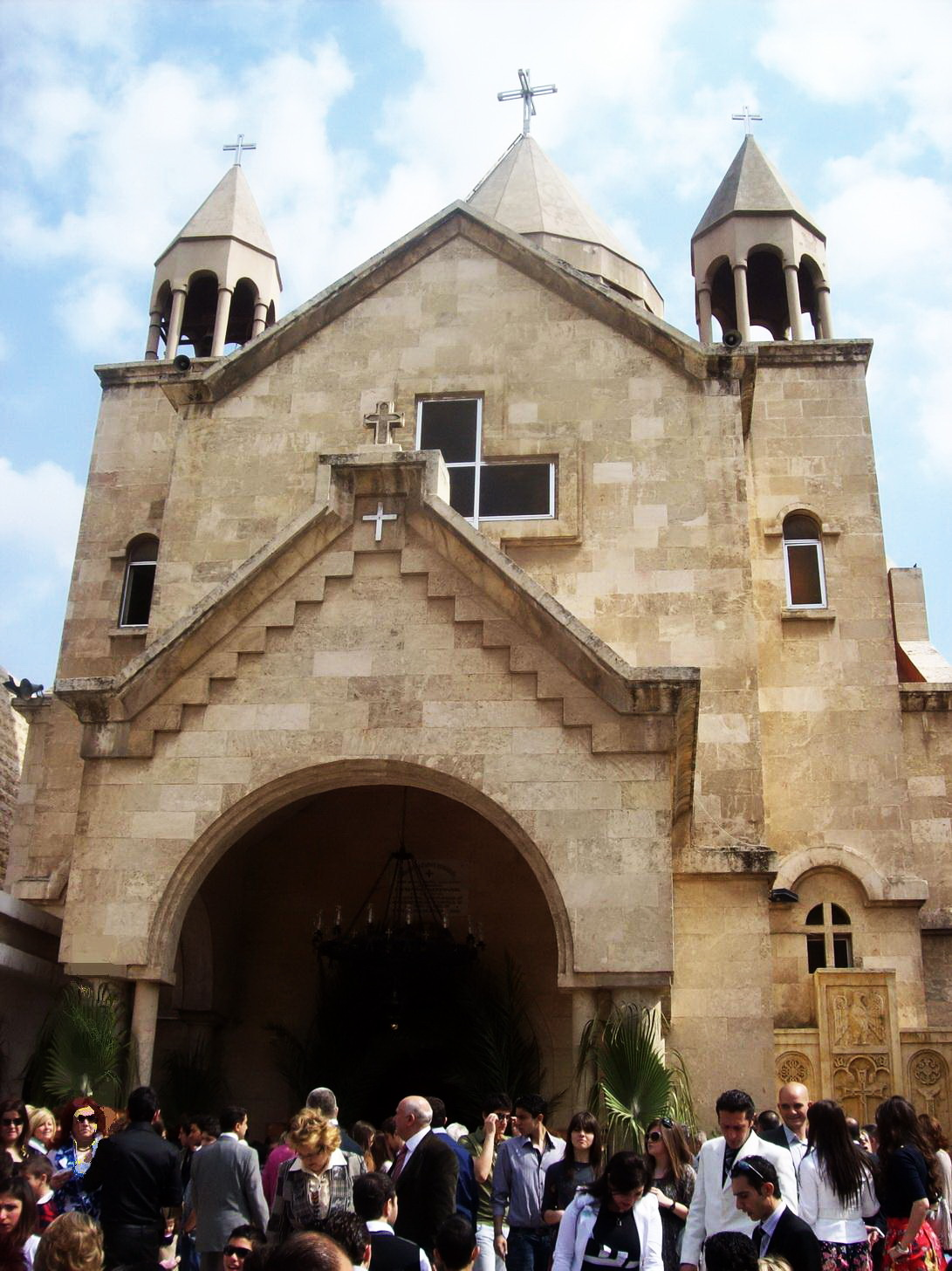
During Palm Sunday

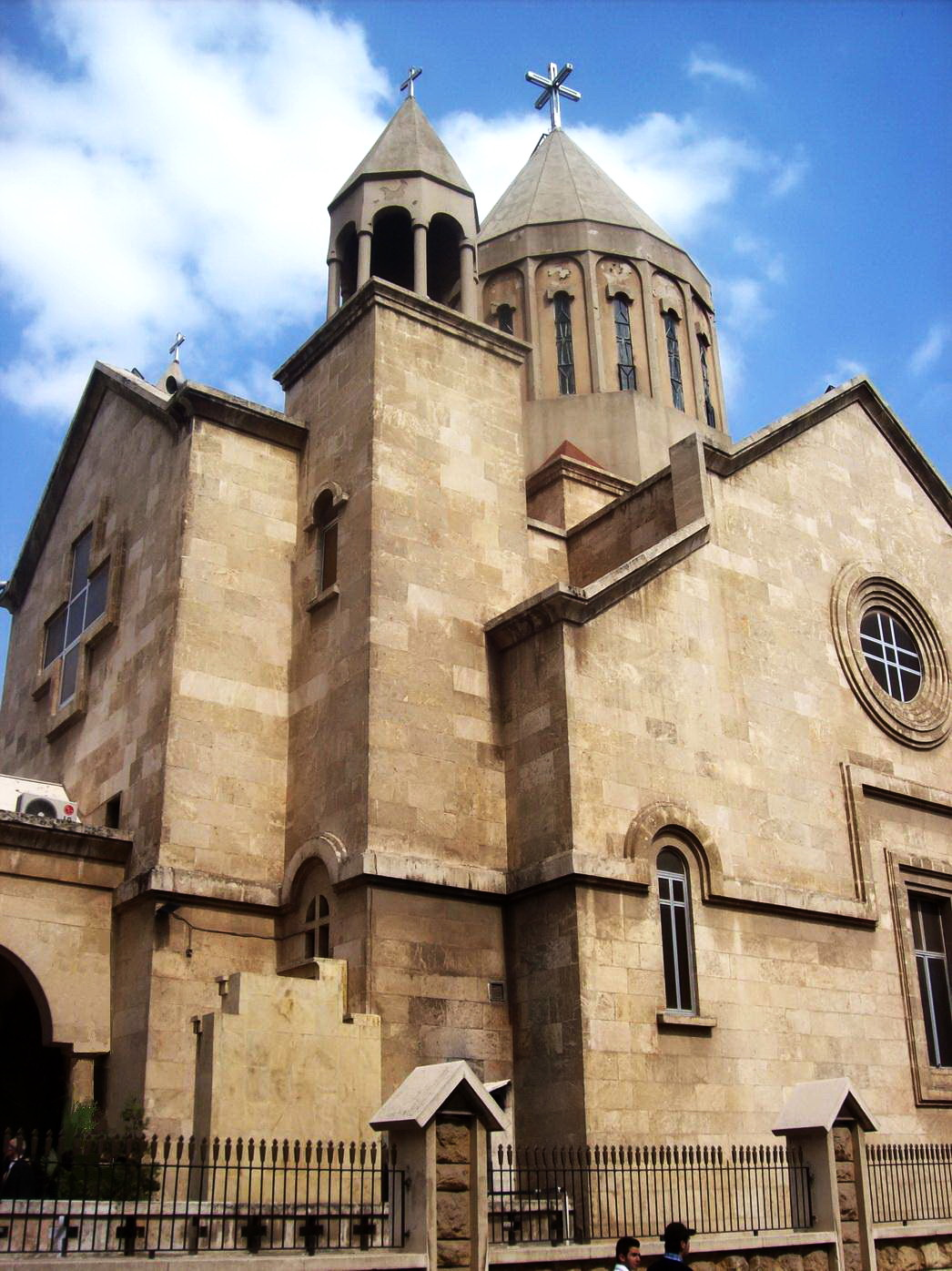
Side view

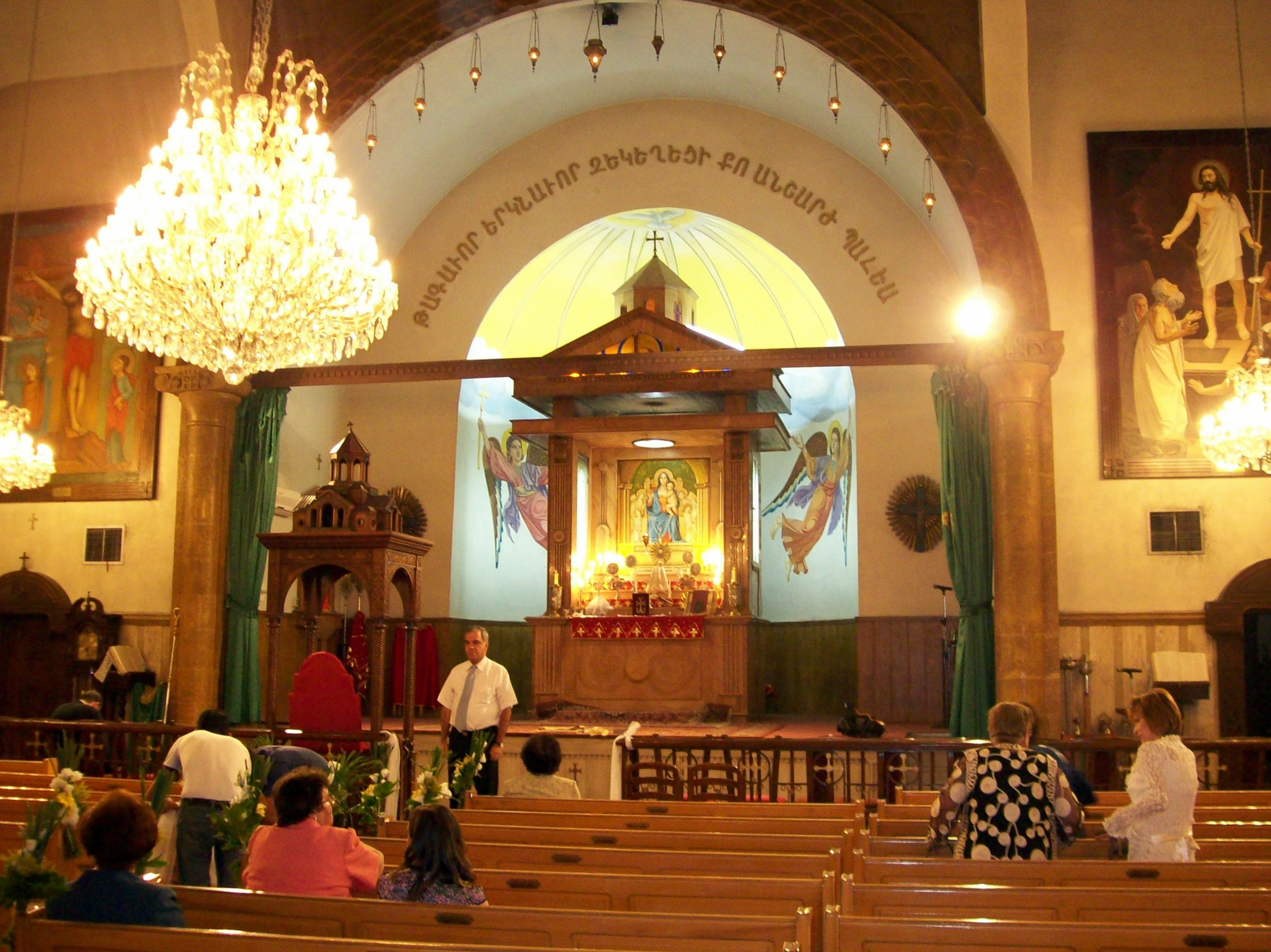
The altar

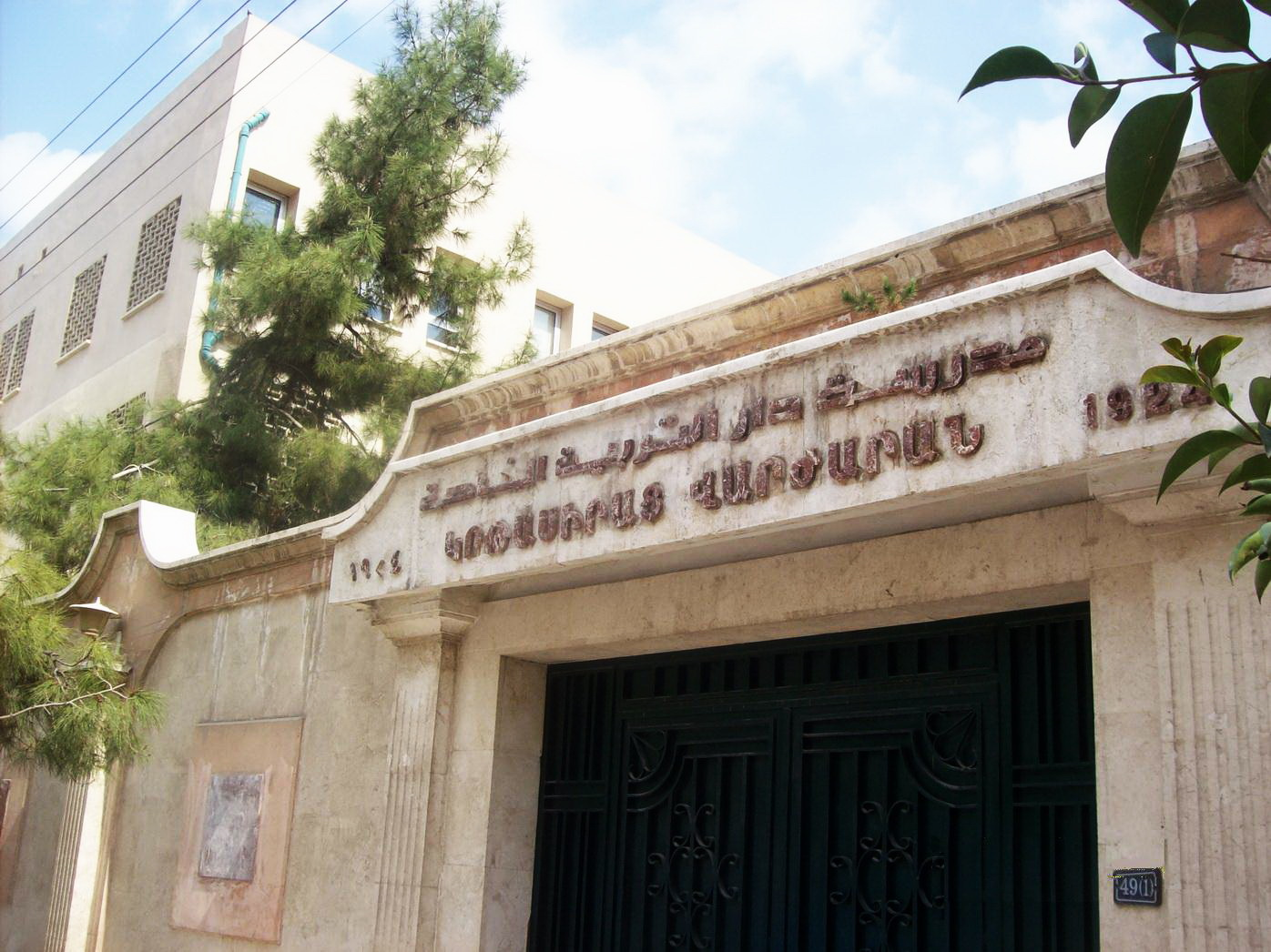
Gertasirats High School at the church complex

== See also ==
- List of churches in Aleppo
- Armenians in Syria
- Armenian Apostolic Church
- Echmiadzin
- List of Armenian Catholicoi of Cilicia
- Cathedral of the Forty Martyrs (Aleppo)
- Holy See of Cilicia
