= Jacob II =

Jacob II or Jakob II may refer to:

- Jacob II of Cilicia
- Jakob II Bernoulli
- Jakob von Baden, also known as Jakob II

== See also ==
James II (disambiguation)
