= Stepanos Orbelian =

Armenian historian and metropolitan bishop

- Born: c. 1250–1260
- Died: 1303/1304
- Resting place: Noravank
- Occupation(s): Metropolitan bishop, historian
- Known for: History of the Province of Syunik

Stepanos Orbelian (Armenian: Ստեփանոս Օրբելեան, (Note: Reformed orthography: Ստեփանոս Օրբելյան) originally spelled Ստեփաննոս, Stepʻannos; c. 1250-1260 – 1303) was a thirteenth-century Armenian historian and the metropolitan bishop of the province of Syunik. He is known for writing his well-researched History of the Province of Syunik.

== Biography ==
Stepanos Orbelian was a member of the Orbelian princely family which ruled Armenia's province of Syunik. The exact year of his birth is unknown, but he is thought to have been born sometime between 1250 and 1260. He received an excellent clerical education and was ordained as a celibate priest in 1280/81. In 1285/6, Stepanos's father Tarsayich Orbelian became the prince of Syunik and sent him to the Armenian Kingdom of Cilicia, where he was hosted at the court of King Levon III for three months. He was consecrated metropolitan bishop of Syunik by the newly elected Catholicos Constantine II on Easter in 1286 and returned to Syunik in 1287. After an extended struggle with the rebellious clergy of Syunik, Stepanos was able to assert his authority over the prelacies of Tatev and Noravank and began the renovation of many ruined churches and monasteries in his diocese. He oversaw the completion of the famous monasterial complex of Tatev in 1297 and supported the continued activity of the University of Gladzor. Stepanos led the eastern Armenian clergy in opposing the Latinophile policies of Catholicos Grigor VII. He died in 1303/4 and was buried in the Orbelians' family mausoleum at Noravank Monastery.

== Works ==
Orbelian is known to have completed three works during his lifetime: the History of the Province of Syunik (Patmutʻiwn Nahangin Sisakan) (Note: Alternative title: Patmutʻiwn tann Sisakan ("History of the House of Syunik").) in 1297; the Lament on Behalf of the Cathedral (Voghb i dimatsʻ surb Katʻoghikēin), where he calls on the Armenians to repopulate historic Armenia, which was under Mongol rule at the time, in 1300; and the Argument Against Dyophysitism (Hakacharut'iun unndem yerkabnakats'), in 1302, a work criticizing the pro-Byzantine and Westernizing tendencies of Grigor VII Anavarzetsi of Cilicia.

Of the three, the most prominent is that on the history of Syunik and the Orbelian family. Before he began writing it, he conducted an extensive amount of research, utilizing a wide variety of sources derived from speeches, letters, colophons, previous histories and chronicles by Armenian historians, as well as works by Georgian authors. Like other Armenian historians and chroniclers, Orbelian's work briefly narrates the beginning of the world starting with Adam and Eve, but then moves on to tell Syunik's and Armenia's history, spanning from the time of king Tiridates I to the end of the thirteenth century. Orbelian's work is especially valuable as it contains many previously unknown details about the province and Armenian history. In 1864 and 1866, Orbelian's History of the Province of Syunik was translated into French (with excerpts translated into Georgian and Russian) by orientalist Marie-Félicité Brosset. A translation into modern Armenian was published by linguist Ashot Abrahamyan in 1986. Robert Bedrosian published an English translation of Orbelian's history in 2012. A Russian translation of the history by Margarita Darbinyan was published in 2020.

== Bibliography ==
- Bedrosian, Robert (2012). Step'annos Orbelean's History of the State of Sisakan. Long Branch, N. J.: Sources of the Armenian Tradition.
- Hacikyan, Agop J.; et al., eds. (2002). The Heritage of Armenian Literature: From the sixth to the eighteenth century. Detroit: Wayne State University Press. ISBN 0-8143-3023-1.
- Torosyan, Kh. (1985). "Stepanos Orbelian". In Hambardzumyan, Viktor (ed.). Soviet Armenian Encyclopedia (in Armenian). Vol. 11. Yerevan. pp. 139–140.
