= Gregory VII =

Gregory VII may refer to:

- Pope Gregory VII (c. 1015–1085)
- Catholicos Gregory VII of Cilicia (r. 1293–1307)
- Patriarch Gregory VII of Constantinople (r. 1923–1924)
