= Constantine II of Armenia =

Constantine II of Armenia may refer to:

- Constantine II, Prince of Armenia, who ruled around 1129/1130
- Constantine II, King of Armenia, who ruled from 1342–1344
- Constantine II the Woolmaker, catholicos in 1286–1289 and 1307–1322
