= Constantine III =

Constantine III may refer to:

- Constantine III (Western Roman emperor), self-proclaimed western Roman Emperor 407–411
- Heraclius Constantine, Byzantine Emperor in 641
- Constans II, Byzantine emperor 641–668, sometimes referred to under this name
- Constantine III of Abkhazia, king of Abkhazia in 898/99–916/17
- Constantine III of Scotland, king of Scotland 995–997
- Patriarch Constantine III of Constantinople (ruled 1059–1063)
- Constantine III of Armenia (ruled 1344–1362)
- Constantine III of Cilicia, Catholicos of the Holy See of Cilicia in 1323–1326
- Constantine III, Prince of Mukhrani (1696–1756), Georgian prince

== See also ==
- Constantius III
