= Akhtala Monastery =

Cultural heritage monument of Armenia

Akhtala Vank, Pghindzavank Ախթալայի վանք, Պղնձավանlք
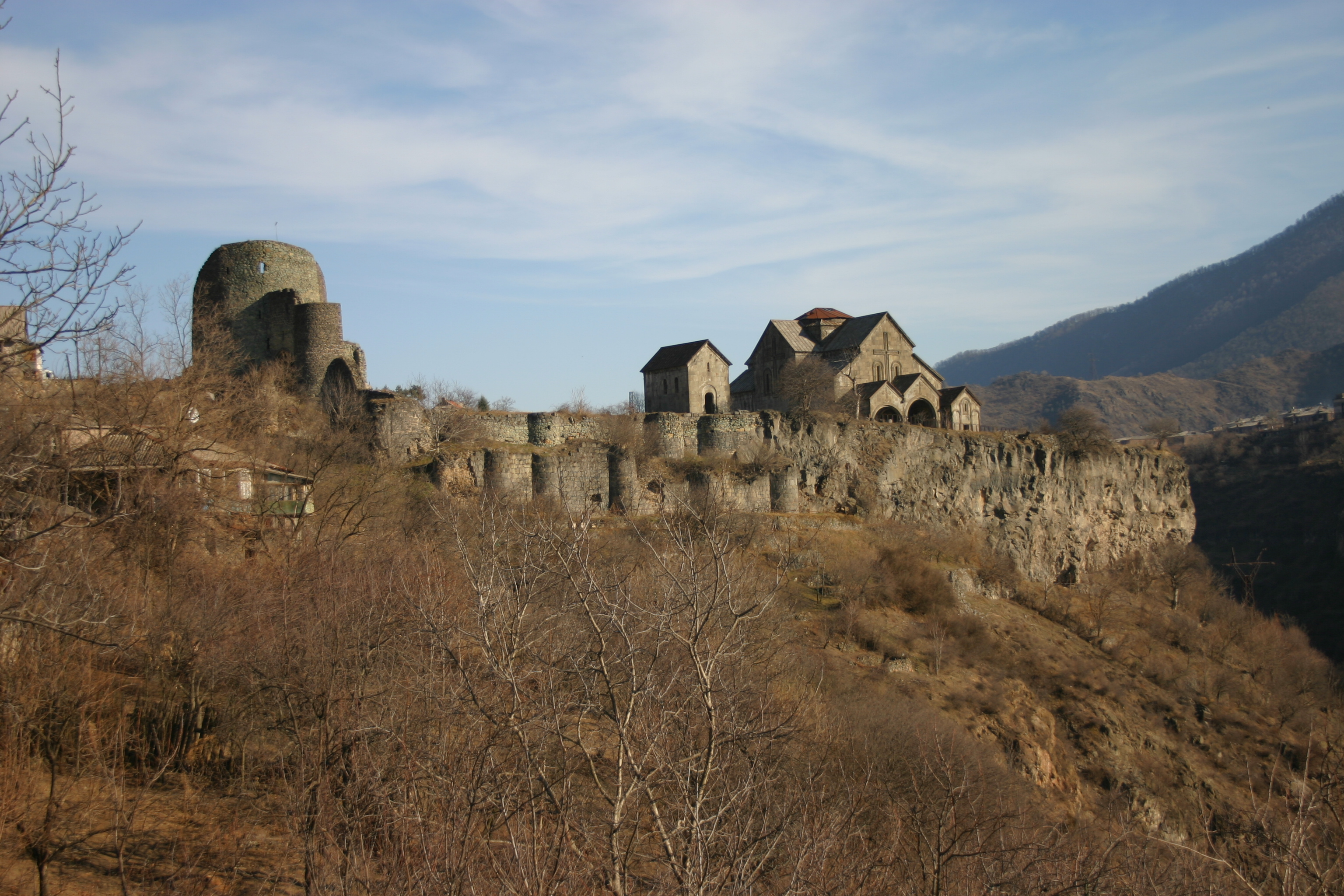

- Location within Armenia

Religion
- Affiliation: Armenian Apostolic Church

Location
- Location: Lori Province, Armenia
- Coordinates: 41.150578°N 44.763919°E

Architecture
- Type: Monastery, Church, Fortress
- Style: Armenian
- Completed: 10th century.

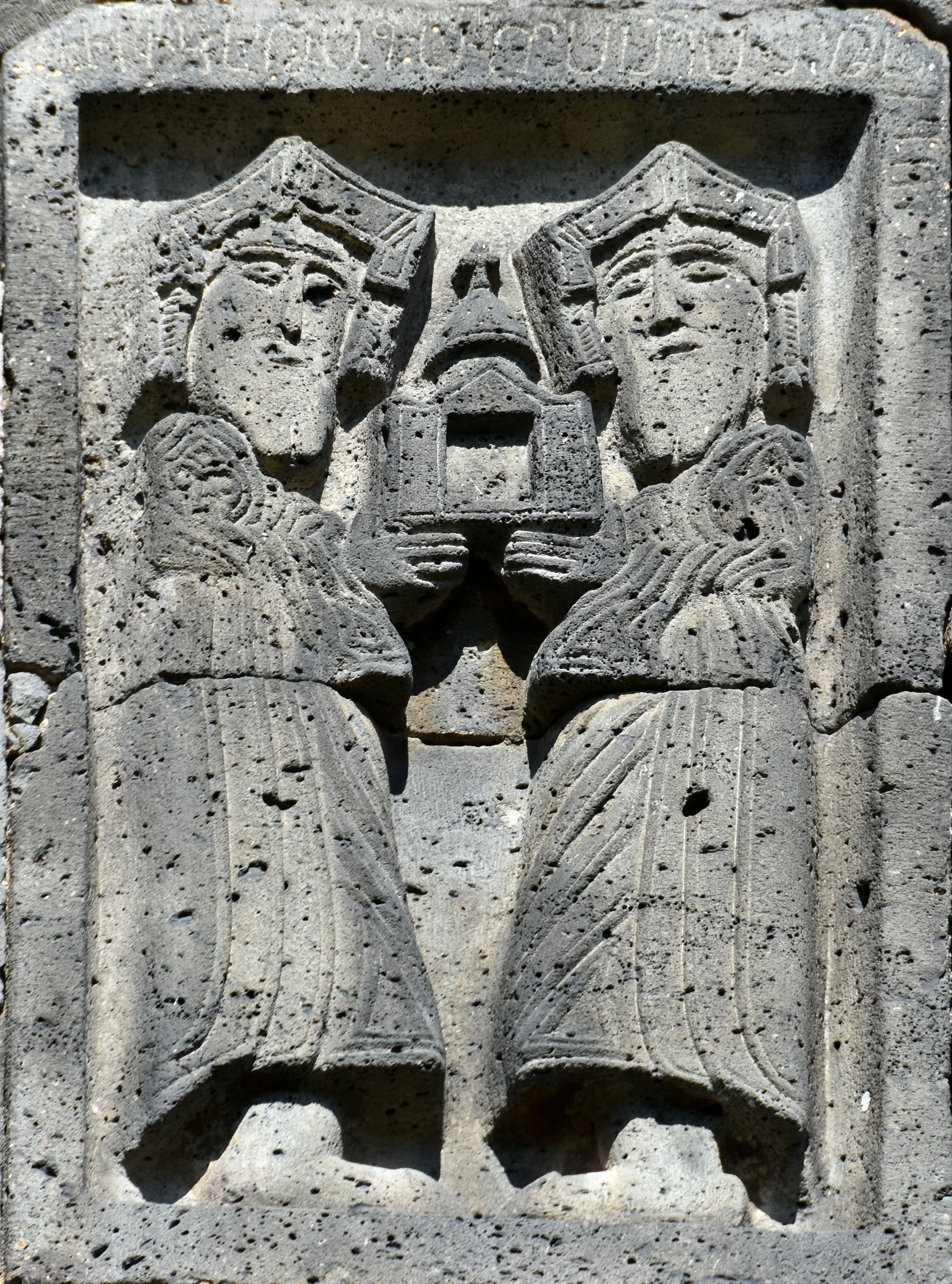
Smbat and Gurgen Bagratuni, relief from Sanahin monastery.

Akhtala (Armenian: Ախթալայի վանք), also known as Pghindzavank (Armenian: Պղնձավանք, meaning Coppermine Monastery) is a 10th-century Armenian Apostolic monastery located in the town of Akhtala in the marz of Lori, 185 kilometers (115 mi) north of Yerevan and 87 kilometers south of Tbilisi . The monastery is currently inactive. The fortress played a major role in protecting the north-western regions of Armenia (Gugark) and is among the most well preserved of all in modern Armenia. The main church at the compound is famous for its highly artistic frescoes, which cover the inside walls, the partitions, and the bearings of the building. The frescoes of Akhtala Monastery, in Armenian-Chalcedonian style, were commissioned by the Zakarid ruler Ivane I Zakarian in 1205–1216.

The modern name of Akhtala was first recorded in a royal decree of 1438. The etymology of the name Akhtala is believed to be of Turkic origin, meaning white glade. The original Armenian name of the settlement where the monastery is built is Pghindzahank, which means copper mine.

== The fortress ==
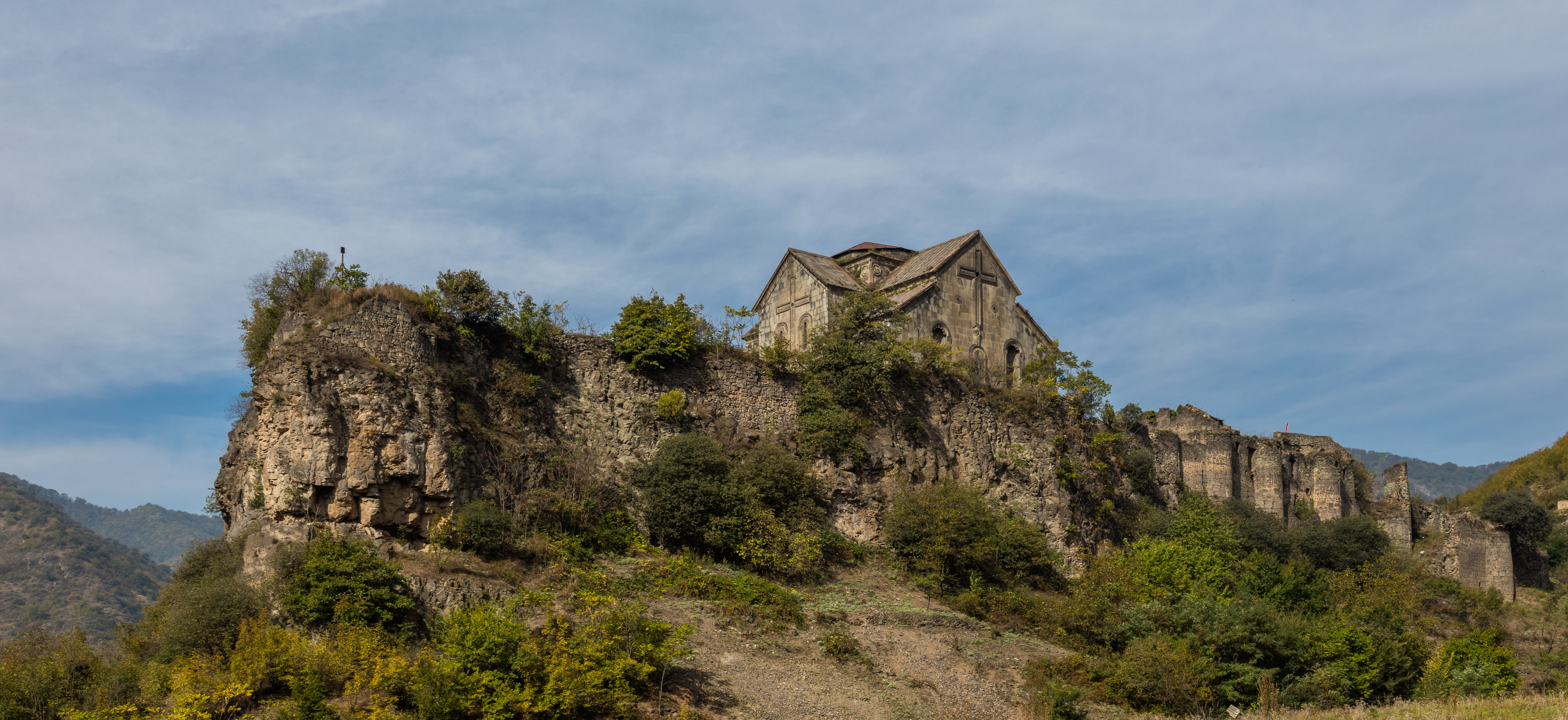
The monastery within the fortress walls

Between 1887 and 1889 the French archaeologist Jacques de Morgan discovered 576 rectangular stone sepulchers, along with cultural items made of clay, bronze and iron near Akhtala dating back to the 8th century BC. The settlement of modern Akhtala was known as Agarak in the 5th century. The fortress was almost certainly built on top of Bronze and Iron Age foundations. It was built in the late tenth century by the Kyurikids, this branch of the Bagratunis originated from Gurgen (the name was pronounced Kyurikeh in the local dialect of Gugark). He was the son of the patrons of Sanahin and Haghpat monasteries located not far from Akhtala, King Ashot III the Merciful and Queen Khosrovanush. Gurgen's brothers were King Smbat II the Conqueror and Gagik I Bagratuni, under whom the Bagratuni Kingdom of Armenia reached the peak of its prosperity.

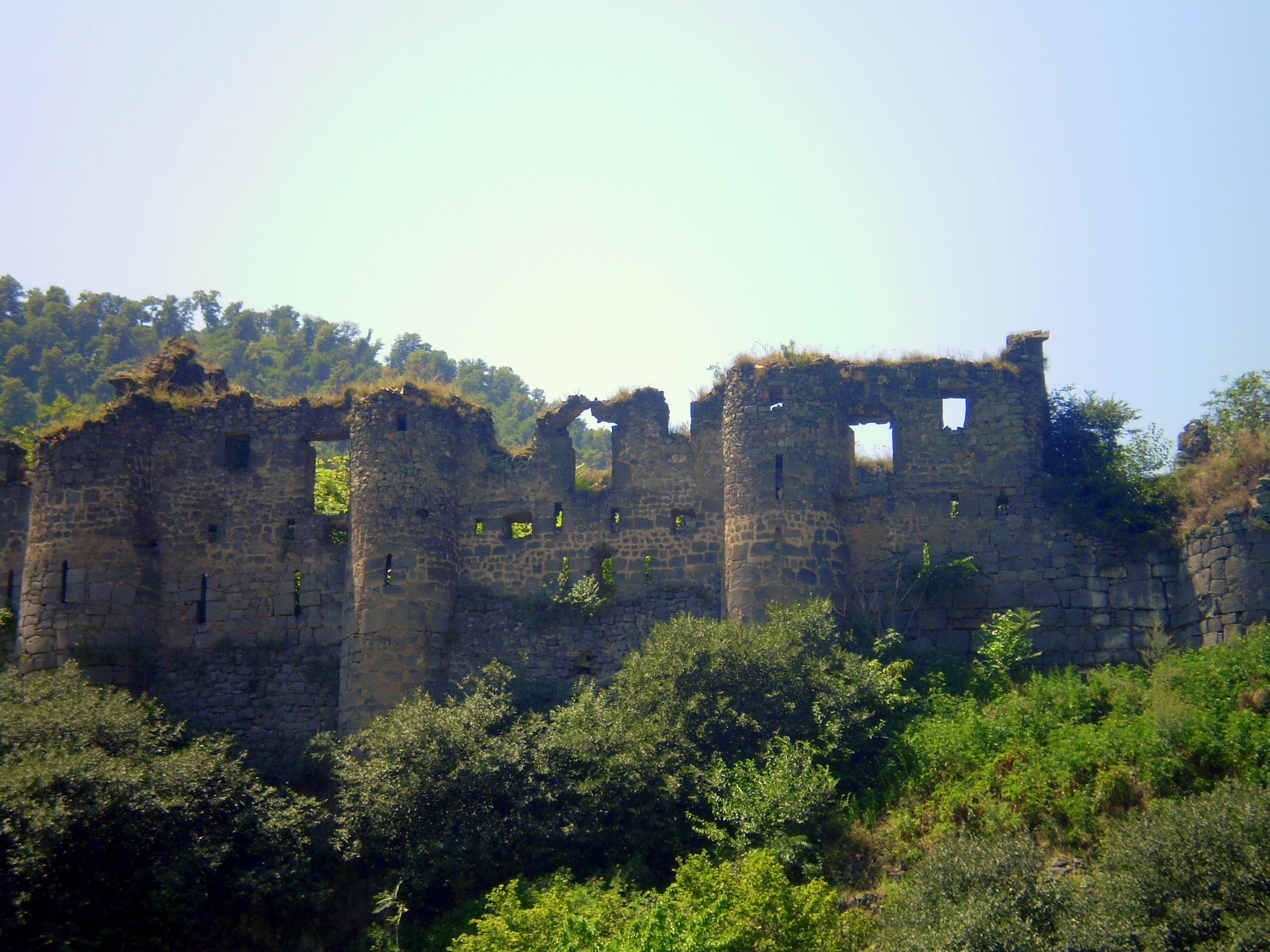
The eastern wall of the fortress.

Ashot III established the Kingdom of Lori (Tashir-Dzoraget Kingdom) in Gugark for strategic reasons and enthroned Gurgen in 982. Gurgen along with his brother Smbat are depicted on the sculptures of the patrons in both Sanahin and Haghpat. When the Tashir-Dzoraget kingdom fell as a result of Seljuk raids the Kyurikids migrated to Tavush and Metsnaberd yet they maintained ties with their ancestral fortress and compound in Akhtala. The fortress was built on an elevated rocky outcrop surrounded by deep canyons from three sides forming a natural protection. The somewhat accessible parts between the cliffs are reinforced by towers and walls. The only entrance to the compound is on the northern side protected by bell-shaped towers and walls. The walls and towers of the fortress are built of bluish basalt and lime mortar. The Kyurikids gradually lost their influence under the Seljuk grasp by the end of the 12th century.

The monastic life was revived in Akhtala when the Zakarians heading the combined Georgian and Armenian forces liberated most of Armenia. The 13th-century historians Kirakos Gandzaketsi and Vardan Areveltsi called the area Pghndzahank (copper mine), because of rich copper deposits in the surroundings. Gandzaketsi writes the following: "Ivane, Zakare's brother, also died [that year] and was buried at Pghndzahank' near the church which he himself had built, taking it from the Armenians and making it into a Georgian monastery."

Pghndzahank became the property of Ivane Zakarian in the 1180s. While Ivane's brother Zakare was Armenian Apostolic, Ivane had accepted Georgian Orthodoxy in the Georgian court. Several monasteries in northern Armenia were converted by the Zakarians-Mkhargrdzeli to Georgian Orthodoxy, a prominent example is the monastery of Kobayr. By doing so Ivane enhanced his position within the Georgian court and gained influence among the Chalcedonian Armenians who mostly inhabited Northern and North-Western Armenia. The Zakarians began to lose control starting in the 1220s during the disastrous Mongol invasions of Georgia. The son of Ivane, Avag was forced to recognize his subordination to the Mongol leader Chormaqan. The Mongol rule continued until 1340 when it was interrupted by successive conquests of Turkic tribes. The Turkic tribe of Kara Koyunlu began attacking the Caucasus and took control of most of Armenia proper by 1400. Their rule was interrupted by the conquests of Tamerlane. One of the cliffs that surrounds Akhtala is known as Lenktemur, named after Tamerlane who according to local tradition buried one of his wives under the cliff.

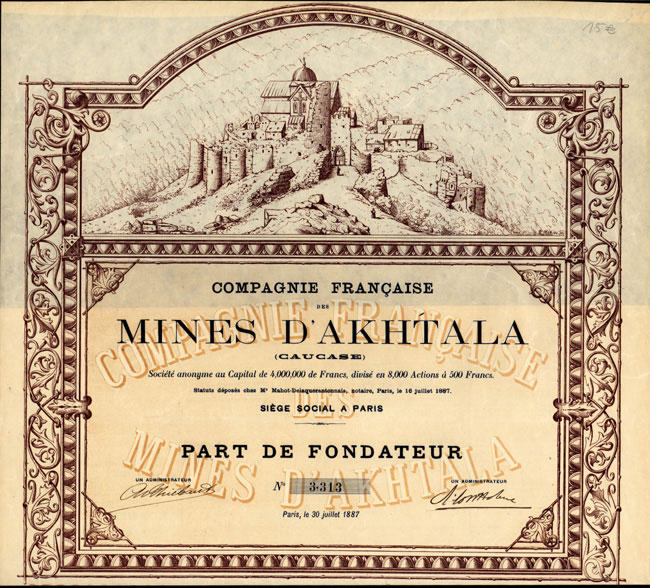
A French bond for the Akhtala mines issued in 1887, depicting the fortress and the monastery.

Since the late 18th century the monastery serviced ethnic Greeks who had settled in Akhtala in order to work in the gold and silver mines. Roughly 800 Greek families were moved from Gümüşhane in the Ottoman Empire to Akhtala in 1763 by the Georgian King Erekle II. The Greeks called the monastery "Meramani". The Greek miners have left inscriptions on the monastery walls. In the 19th century Akhtala was taken over by the Armenian princely family of Melikovs. Currently the monastery has its pilgrimage days on September 20–21. Armenians, Greeks and Georgians visit the monastery on this occasion. The Ambassador of Greece, Panayota Mavromichali visited the monastery on September 20, 2006. An ore mining and processing plant in Akhtala has been dumping copper mine tailings in the pit below the monastery. This has been classified as a threat to local residents.

== Surp Astvatsatsin (Holy Mother of God) church ==
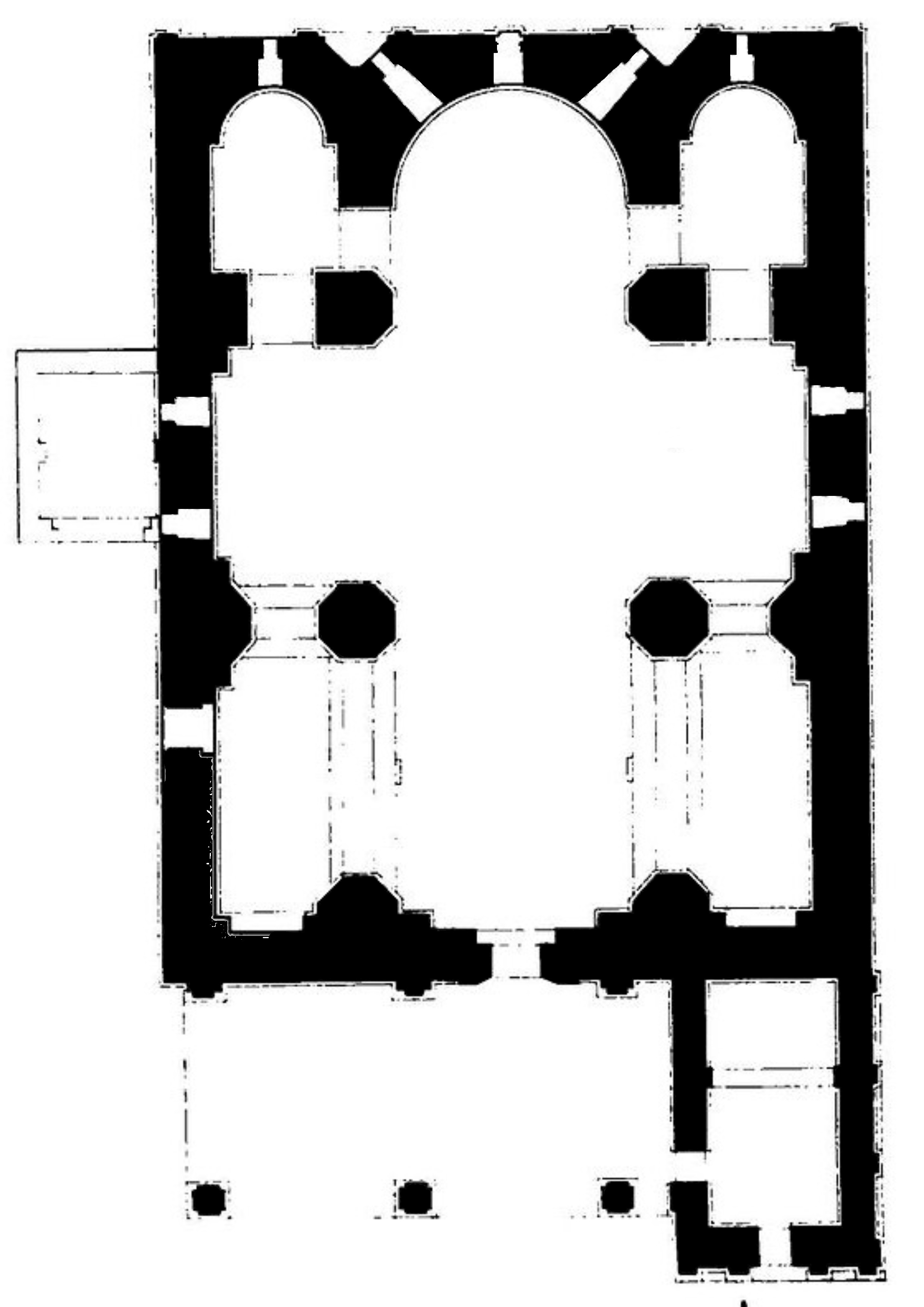
Plan of Akhtala Monastery

The main building of the monastic compound is Surp Astvatsatsin (Holy Mother of God) church. The exact date of the building of the church is unknown. It is generally regarded as an 11th–13th century complex, but the current church has been built on an earlier foundation. Kirakos Gandzaketsi mentions that Ivane Zakarian was buried in the church in 1227. Stepanos Orbelian refers to the church in 1216. Modern researchers date the murals within the church to 1205–1216. Princess Mariam, the daughter of Gurgen II (Kyurikeh II), made a record in 1188 on the back of a khachkar found in a place called Ayor adjacent to Akhtala which refers to the construction of the Holy Mother of God church at Akhtala. The inscription on the khachkar states the following: "I, the daughter of Kyurikeh, Mariam, erected Surp Astvatsatsin at Pghndzahank, those who honor us remember us in their prayers." In 1185 Mariam had constructed the narthex of the main church in Haghpat. According to some local lore, the church was built in the 7th century by a Byzantine emperor of Armenian extraction, Heraclius. Another legend assumes that the church was built in the 5th century by Georgian King Vakhtang I Gorgasali. There is no reasonable evidence to support either story. The church used to contain the cross which according to folklore was used by John the Baptist to baptise Jesus Christ. Vasak, the father of Prince Prosh, is said to have given this relic to Ivane Mkhargrdzeli who later sold it for a large sum to the monastery of Noravank in Syunik.

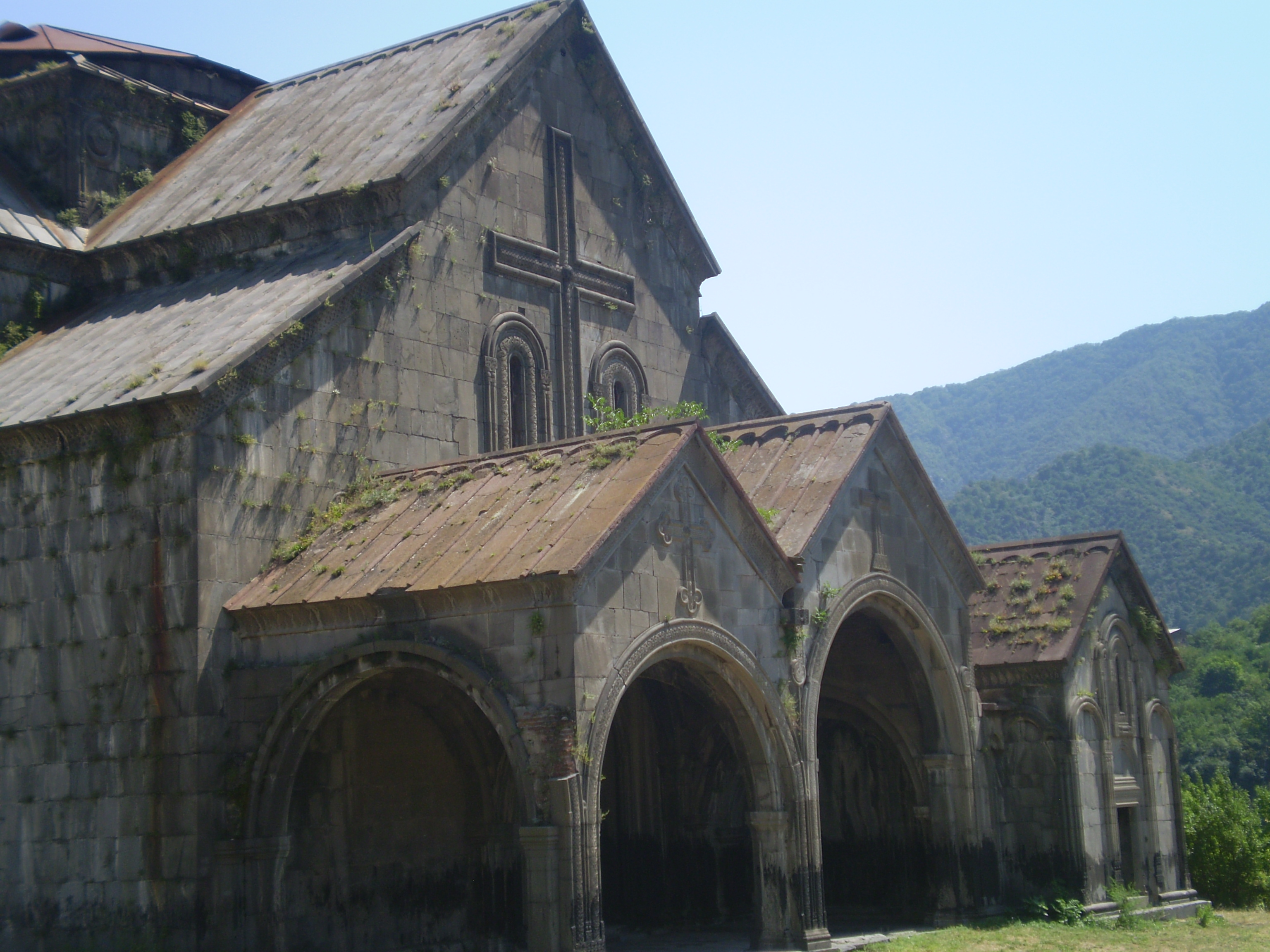
The western facade of the church. The arched hall and entrance.

The church is situated in the middle of the fortress' territory along the longitudinal axis. It belongs to the domed basilica type of churches, where the bearings join with the side-chapels of the apse. Two pairs of arches divided the longitudinal stretched prayer hall into three naves, the central one of which (with double side-chapels) on the eastern side ends with low staged, half-rounded apse and the side-chapels end with sacristies. They are characterized with stylish iconography, richness of theme and variety of different colors (where blue is dominant). The vertical axis of the building was crowned by a massive dome. The pointed dome with the cylindrical drum has not survived. It was damaged during Tamerlane's invasion and completely demolished in 1784 when the Avar Omar Khan invaded the Transcaucasus from Dagestan. In the 19th century, Viceroy of the Caucasus, Prince Mikhail Vorontsov built a semi-spherical wooden dome covered with iron sheets in place of the original dome. The dome was renovated during Soviet years.

== Murals of Surp Astvatsatsin ==
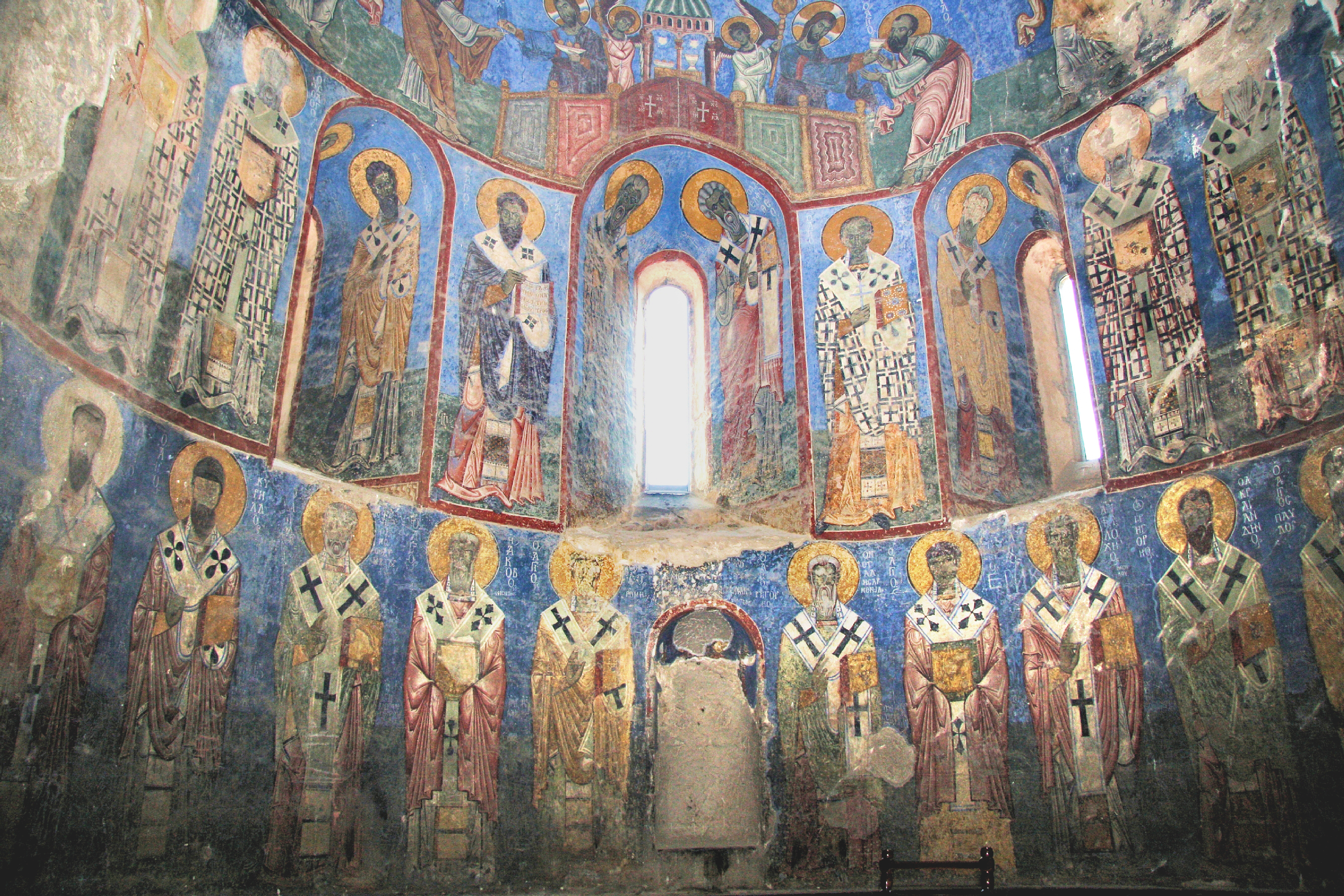
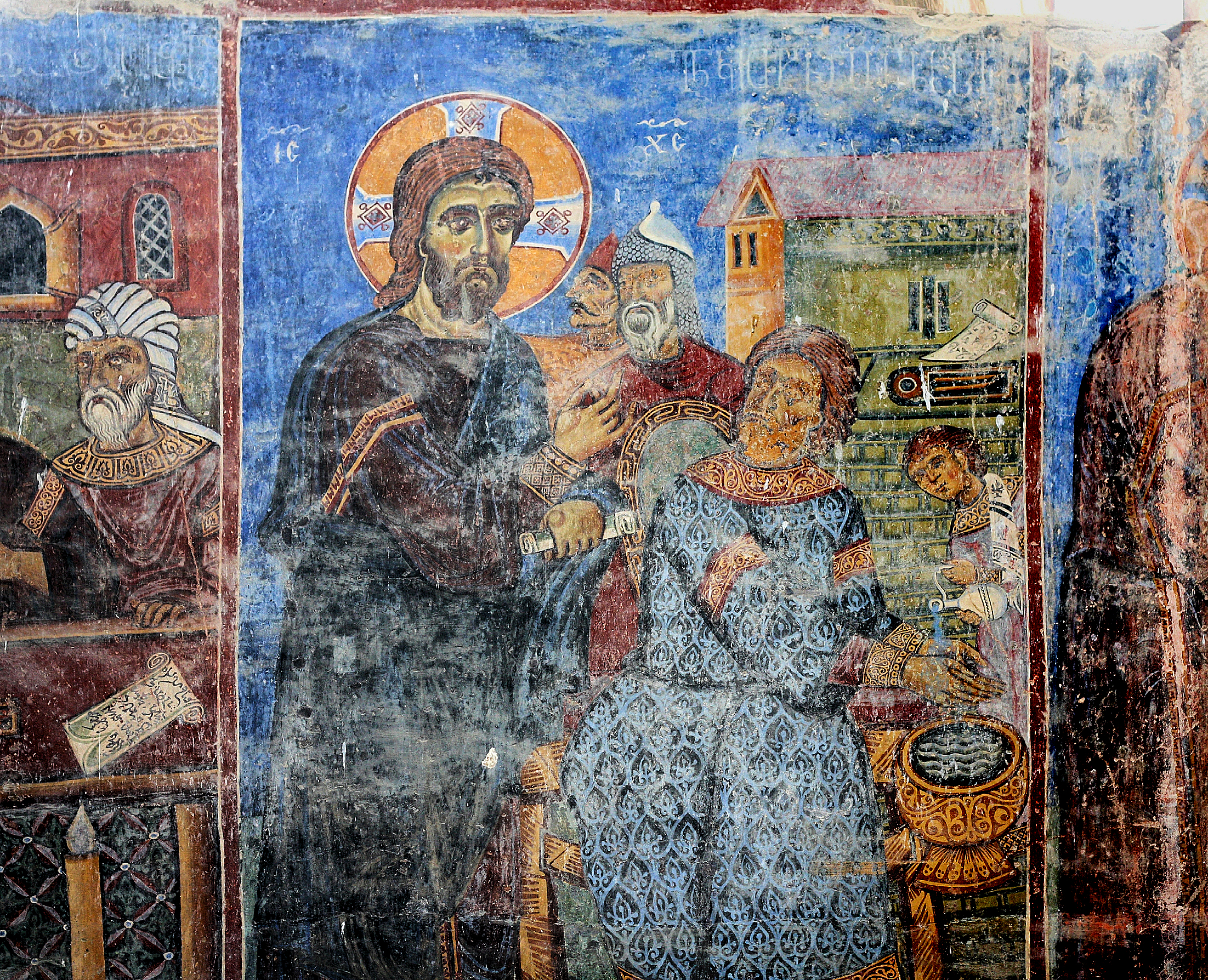
The murals of Akhtala Monastery, in Armenian-Chalcedonian style, were commissioned by Ivane in 1205-1216.

The murals are one of the best representations of Byzantine art outside the traditional borders of Byzantium. The majority of the murals bear scriptures in Georgian and Greek. The murals were painted under the patronage of atabek Ivane Mkhargrdzeli between 1205 and 1216. Parallels have been drawn between the murals and the 11th century Armenian miniature paintings of the Mugni Gospels. The coloring of the murals is characteristic of typical Byzantine art while the thematic solutions are more Armenian. New and Old Testaments scenes as well as various saints including Saint Gregory the Illuminator are depicted on the murals. A large image of the Holy Virgin is depicted in the dome holding Jesus. The mural has been badly damaged and only parts of it survived. Below the Holy Virgin, the Communion is shown where Jesus is depicted twice, turning on the right and left sharing bread with the Apostles. The images of the Apostles Peter, John the Evangelist, Paul and Matthew have survived. The common Christians saints are depicted below the Communion scene, including Pope Sylvester, Saint James the son of Alpheus, Saint John Chrysostom, Basil the Great, Gregory the Illuminator, Jacob of Mtsbin, Clement of Rome, Gregory the Thaumaturgist, Cyril of Alexandria and Eusebius of Caesarea. The murals on the western wall depict the Kingdom of Heaven. The northern wall depicts the trial of Jesus by the high priest of Caiaphas and by the Roman Procurator Pontius Pilate. Some of the murals were renovated in 1979. The arches, niches and columns are also covered by murals.

== Other structures ==
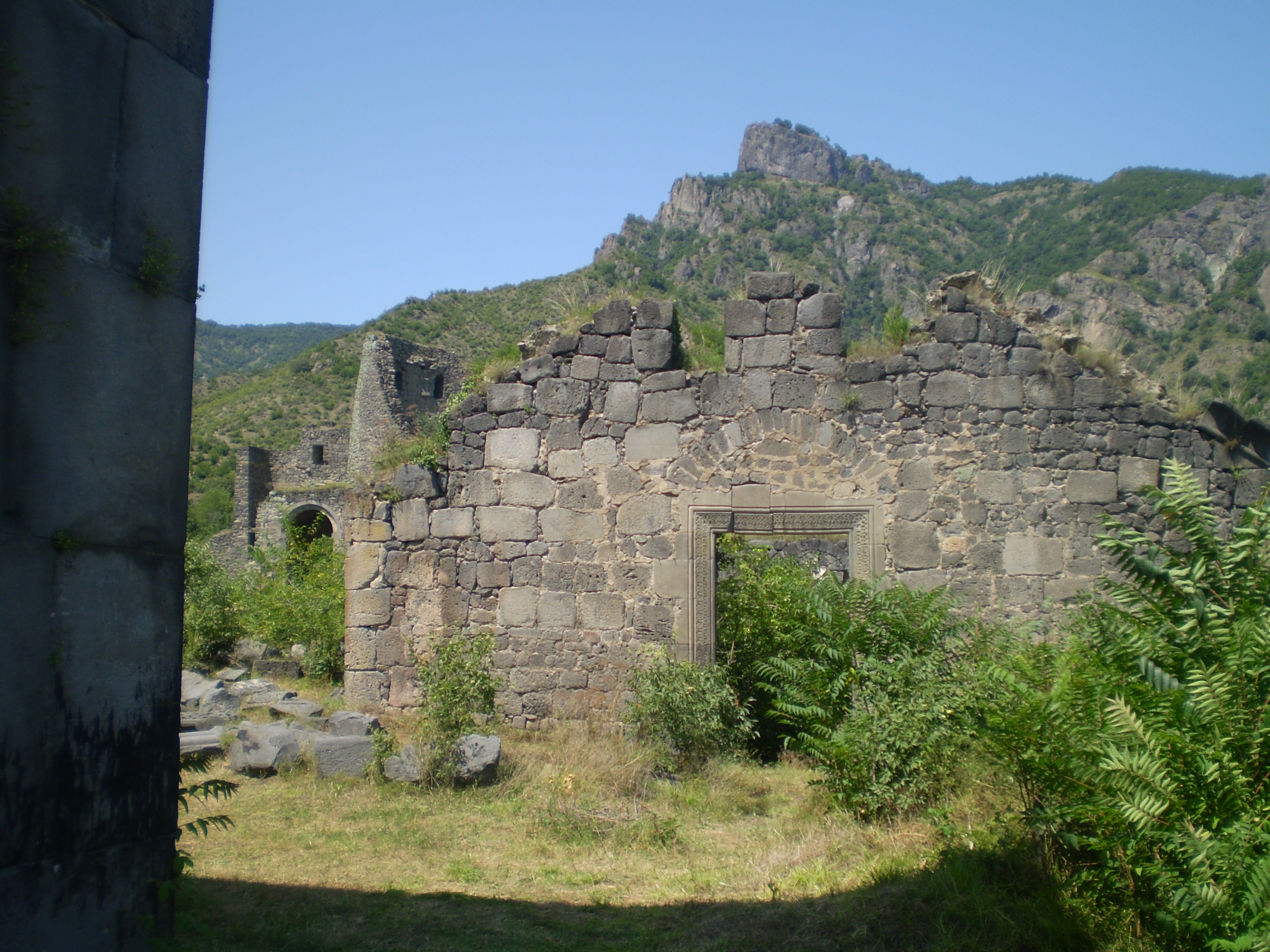
Ruins at the monastery complex.

The most prominent structure after the Holy Mother of God church is a rectangular chapel built against its western wall. The remaining section of the façade of the main church is situated immediately next to it with a ridge roof. Ivane Mkhargrdzeli and his son Avak were buried inside in 1227. A small structure with a lean-to roof is attached to the north wall of the main church. It was used to store ceremonial items. On the north-western side of the monastery, a single nave and ridge-roofed church is located detached from the main church. Another building that hasn't survived used to be located next to it. Numerous dilapidated dwellings and auxiliary structures are scattered in the territory of the fortress such as a two-story building believed to be a residence for guards. There are traditional networks of tunnels, crypts, water reservoirs and wine cellars, found among most monasteries of medieval Armenia. Not far from the monastery one can find other medieval monuments such as the Holy Trinity monastery, Saint George church, a 13th-century spring monument, a 19th-century Russian chapel, a Greek church as well as various khachkars and chapels.

== Known residents ==
Inscriptions from nearby khachkars point out that the monastery was headed by Petreh in the 1240s. The most prominent figure who resided at the monastery was the translator and scribe Simon of Pghndzahank. His diaries have survived. He was born in 1188 and was a clergyman for several years at the monastery translating Byzantine theological literature. He collaborated with another Armenian of Chalcedonian faith, Minas Syunakyats of Trabzon. In 1227 Simon compiled a volume of works by Gregory of Nyssa. His diary reads:

In 1227 I completed the book by Bishop Gregory of Nyssa which was a preserved old copy translated by the sinful and undeserving clergyman Simon who lived in Armenia, near Lore town, at the Holy Mother of God monastery of Pghndzahank. The book was translated during the reign of atabek Ivane, the founder of the monastery, may God grant him and his sons long life.

Simon also translated into Armenian the Elements of Theology by Proclus Diadochos, The Fountain of Wisdom by John Damascene, The Ladder of Divine Ascent by John of Sinai, A History of Georgia (Kartlis Tskhovreba) and The Greek Prayer Book. Simon also noted in his diaries that he only translated works which previously had not been translated into Armenian. The prominent Armenian filmmaker of the 20th century Sergei Parajanov filmed two episodes of his film The Color of Pomegranates at the monastery.

== Gallery ==
Akhtala Monastery

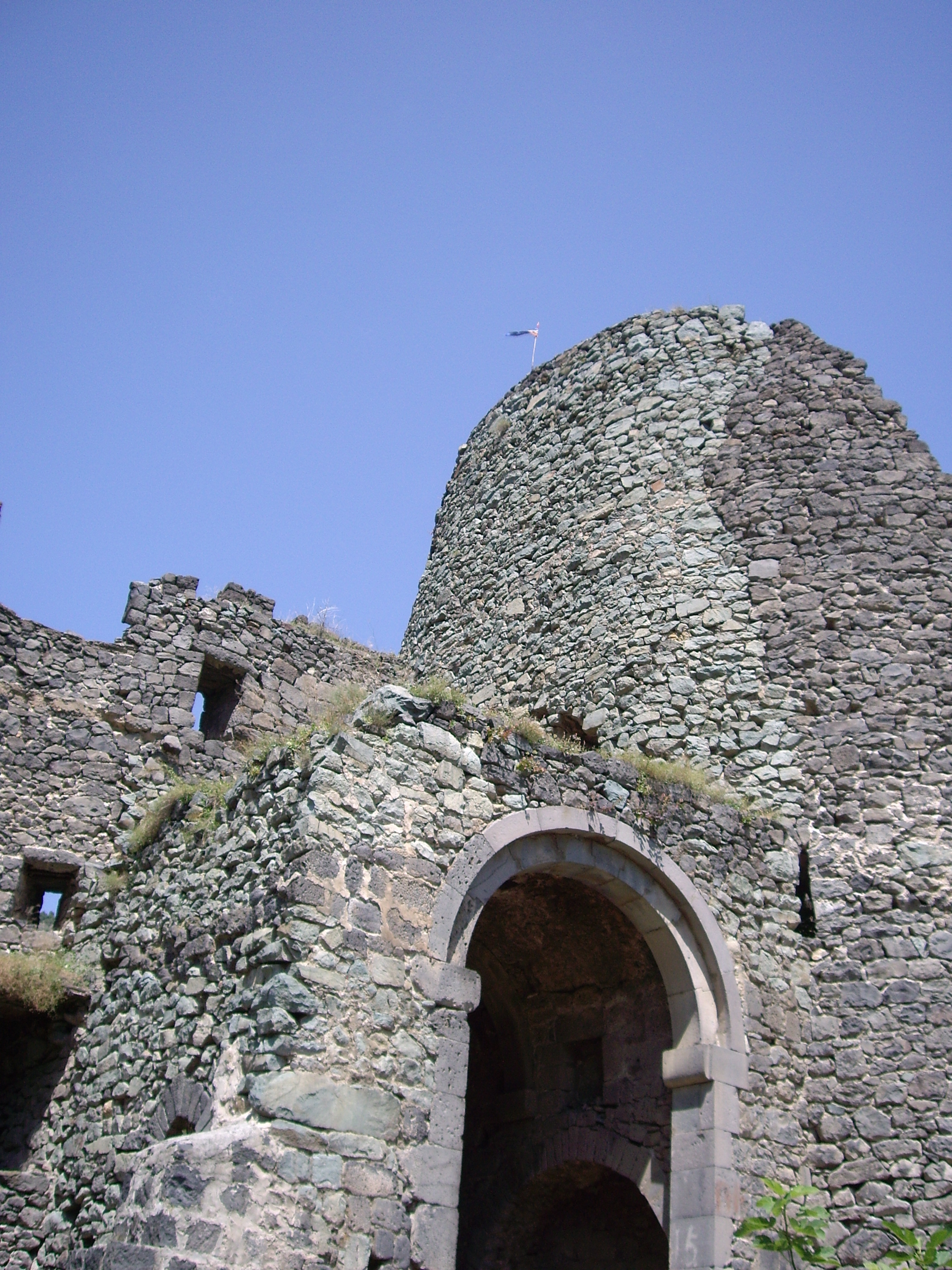
Northern wall. The only entrance to the compound

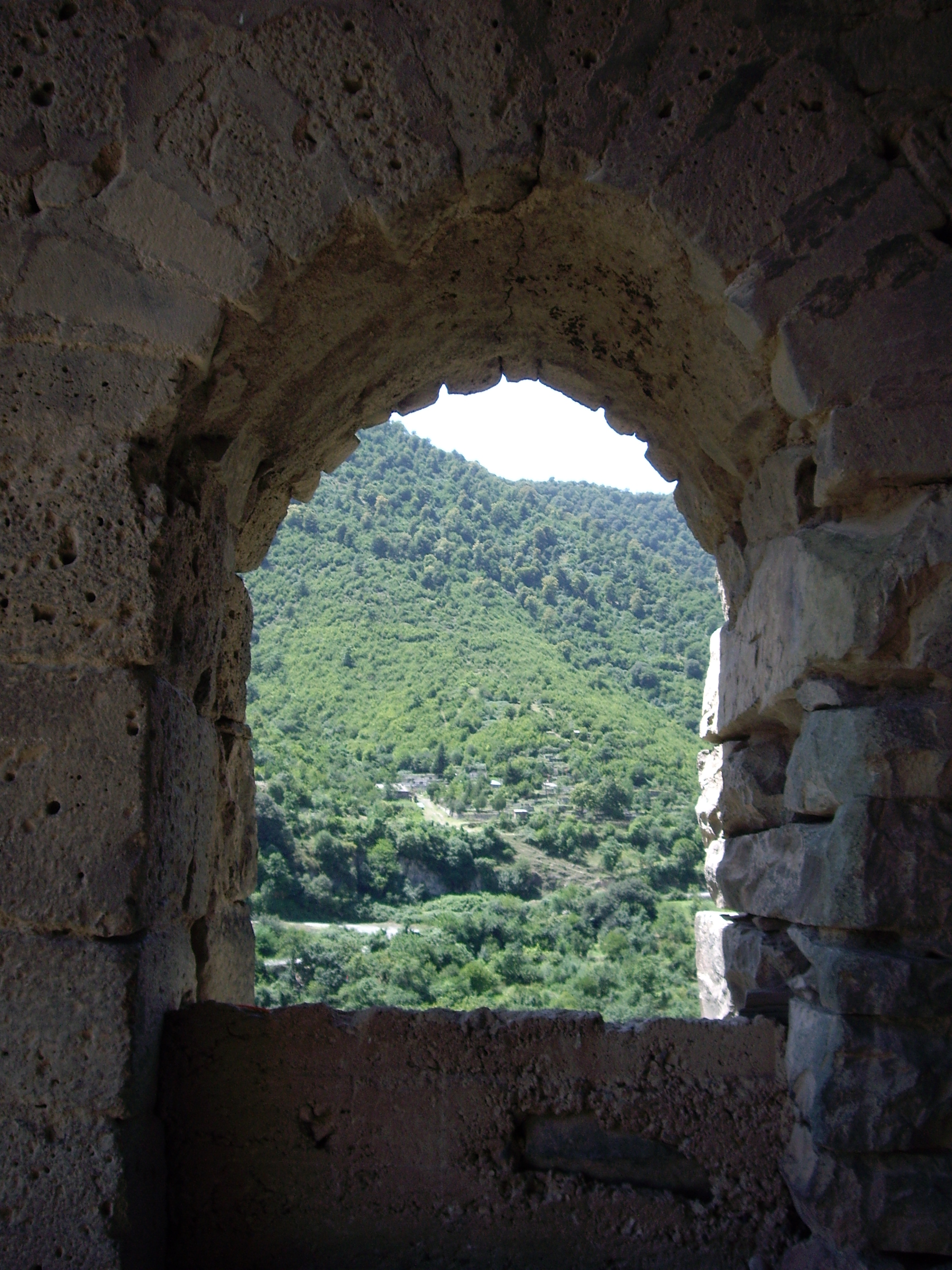
A view of the hills from one of the windows of the fortress

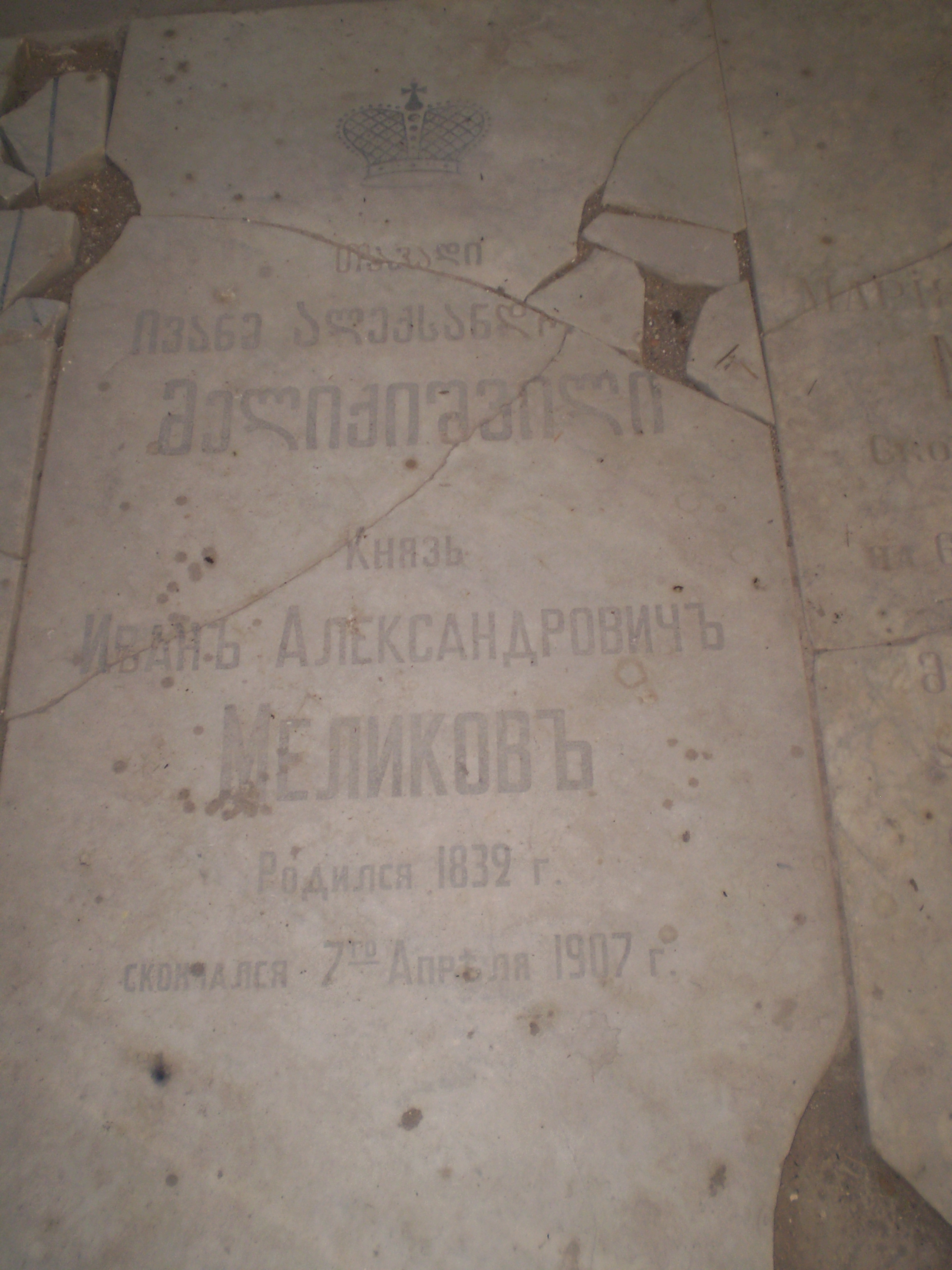
Tomb of Prince Ivan Aleksandrovich Melikov

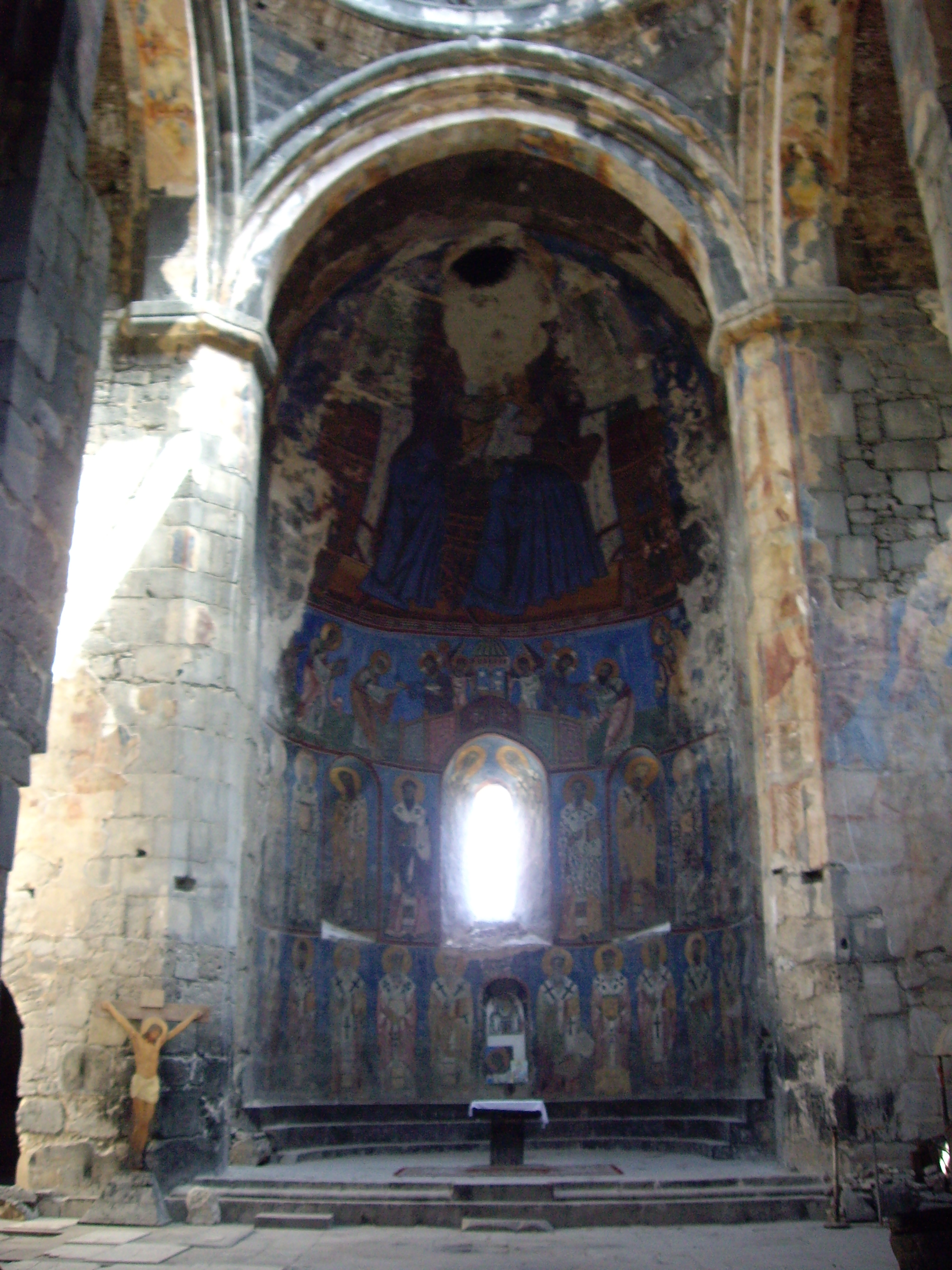
The main altar of the church and its murals

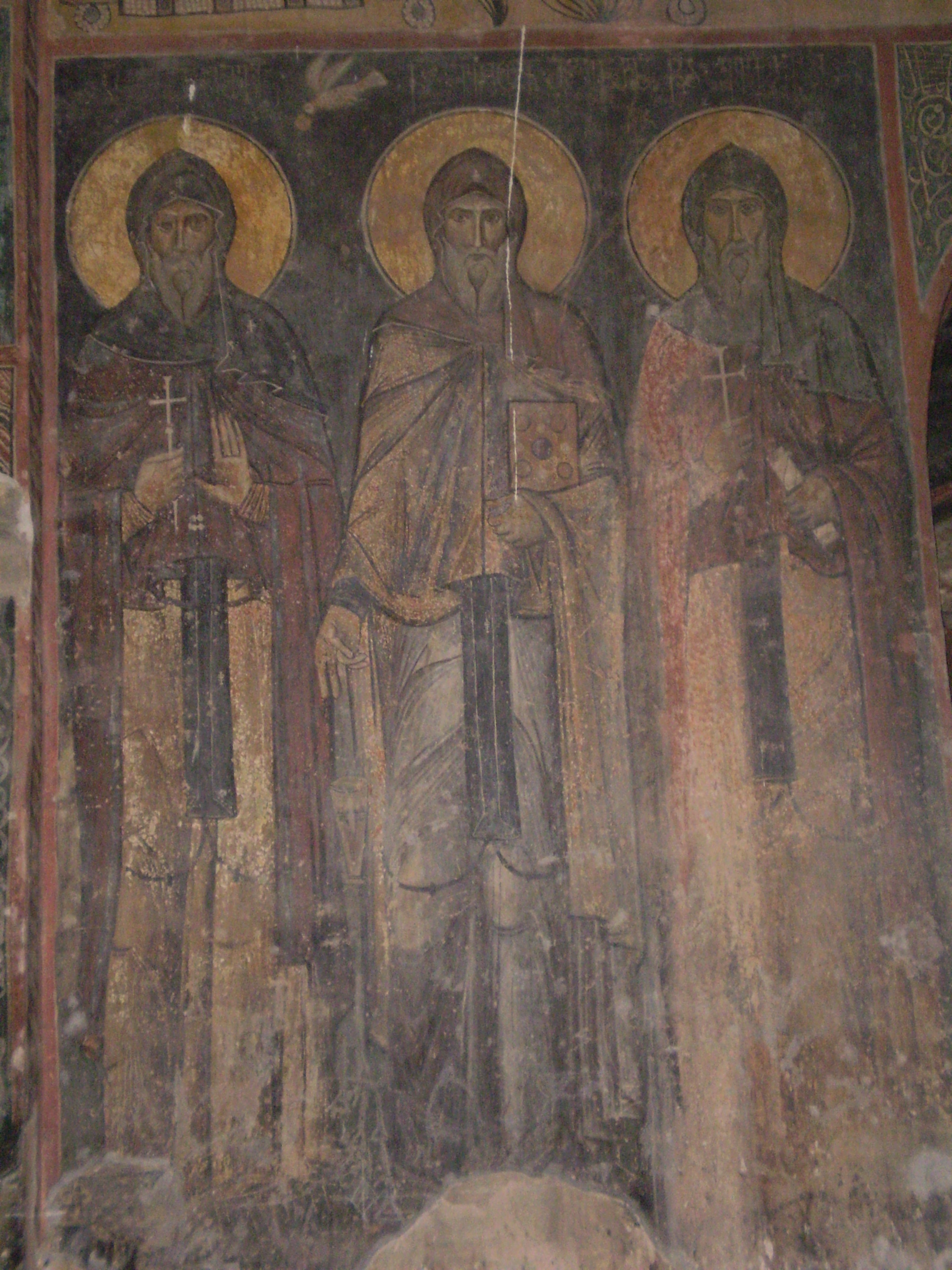
Murals on the western wall (bottom left)

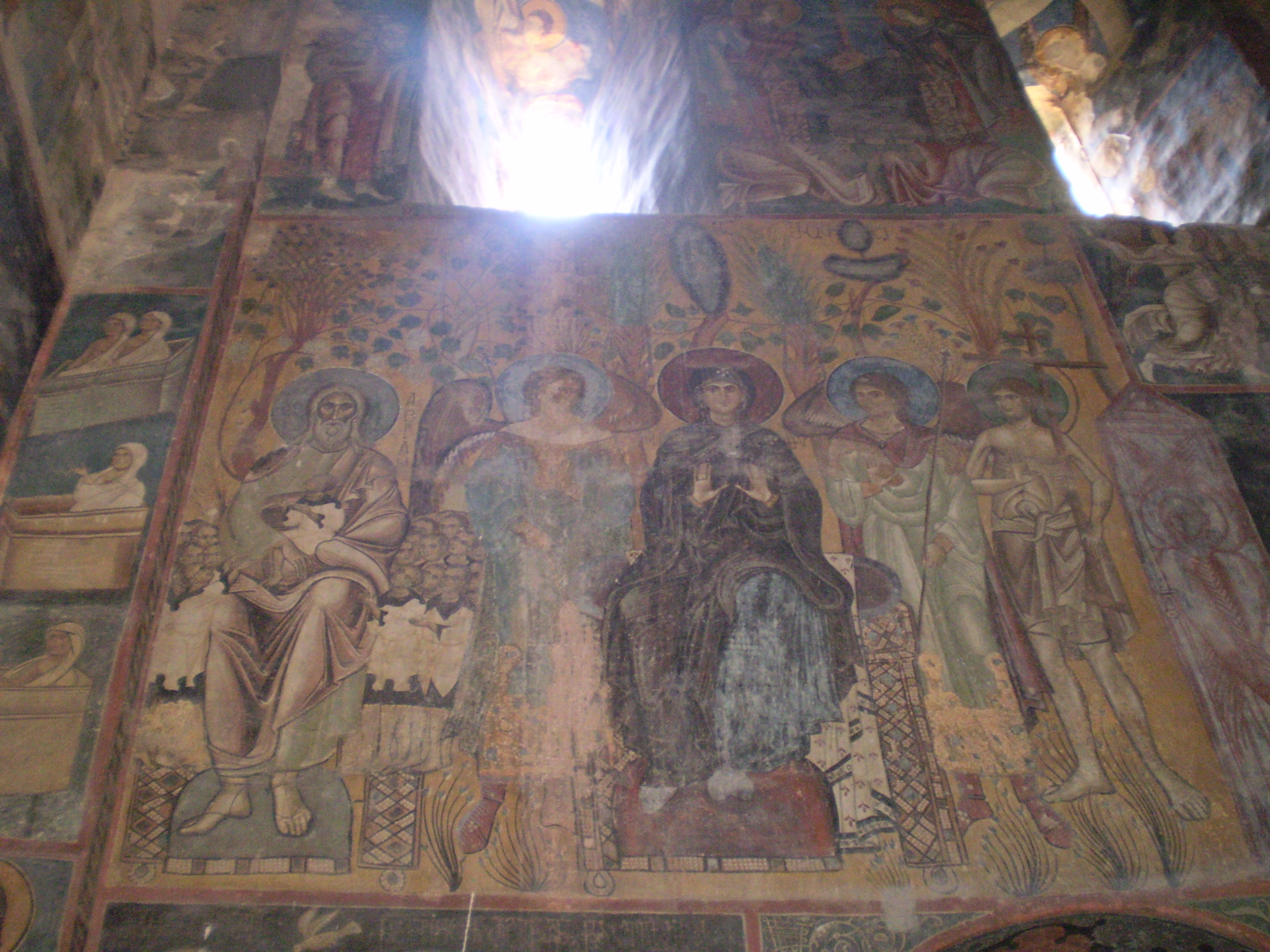
Murals on the western wall (middle)

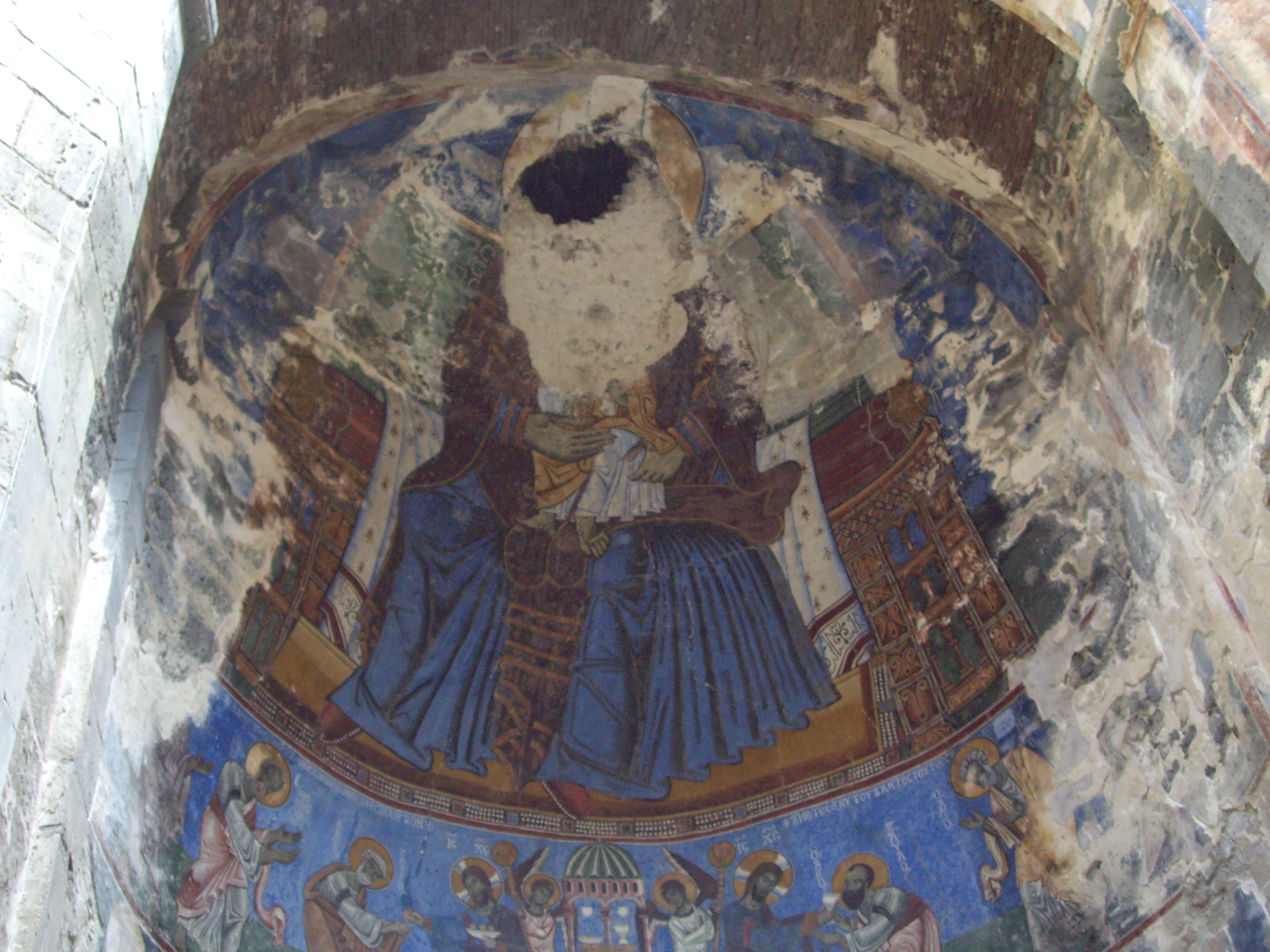
The badly damaged painting of the Holy Virgin holding Jesus

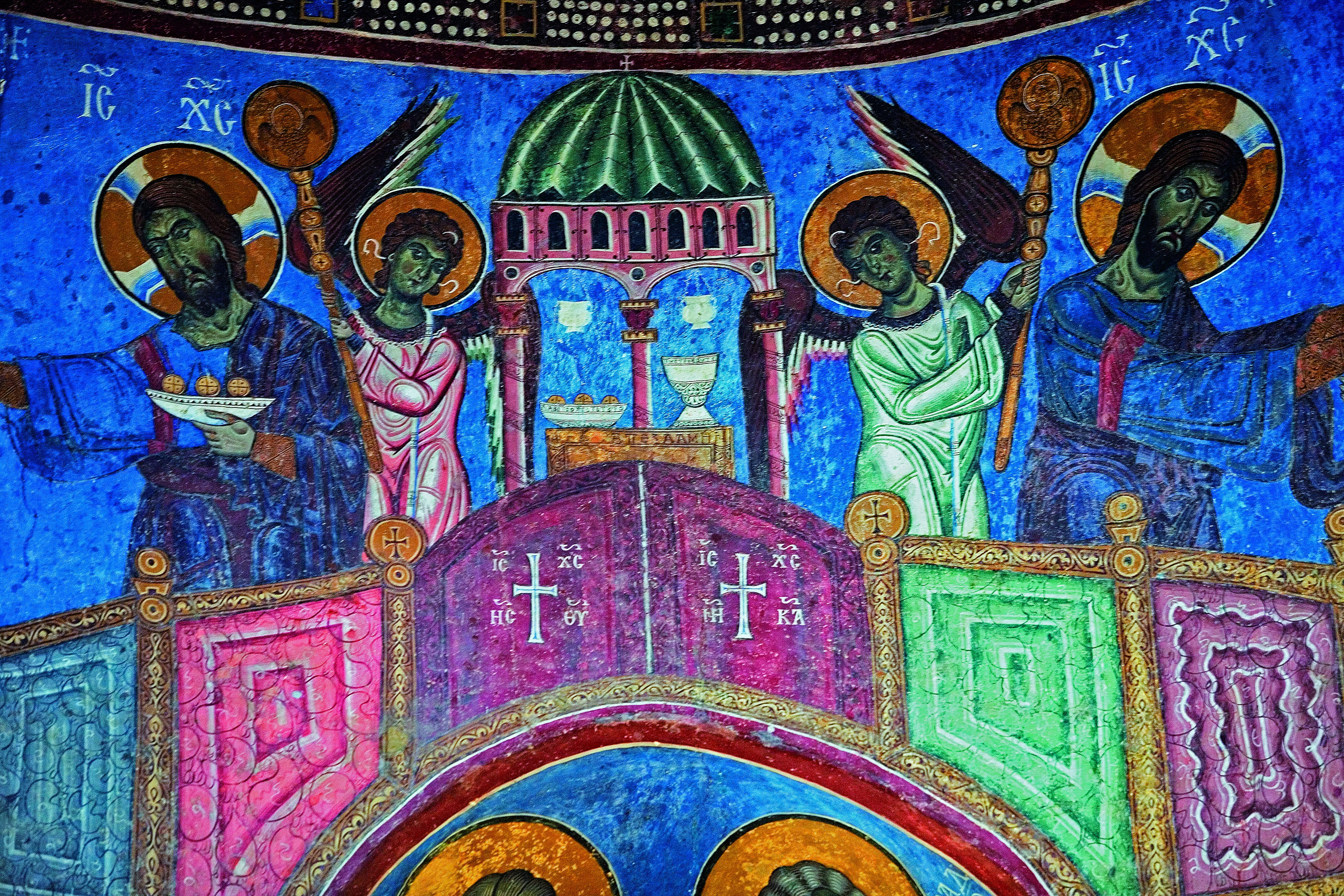
Fresco at the monastery

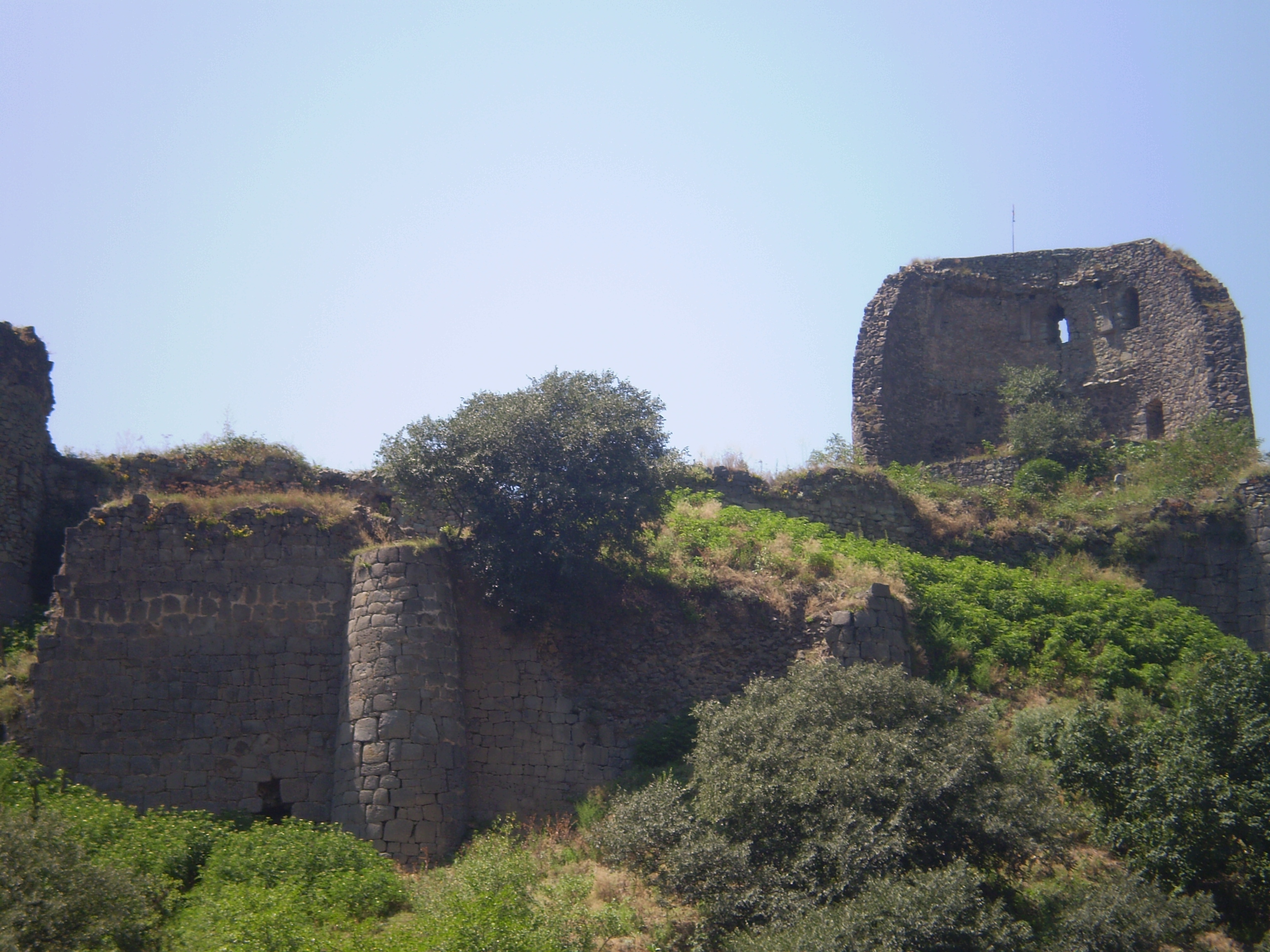
A section of the eastern wall

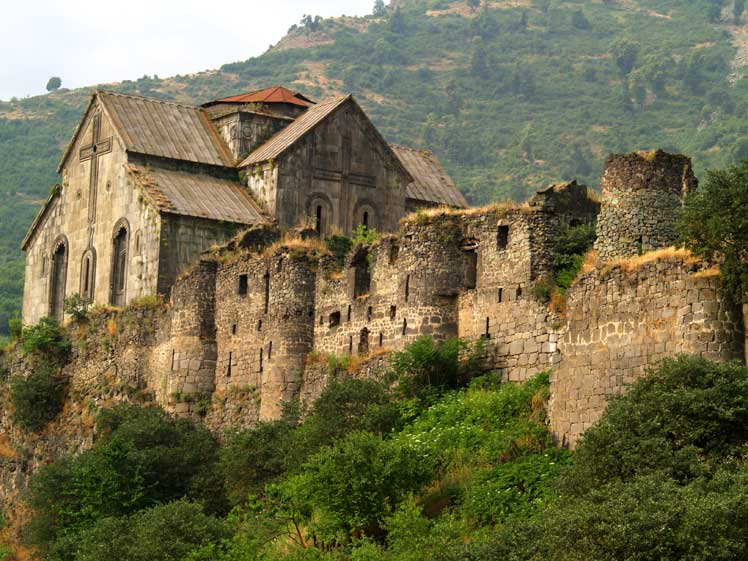
Akhtala monastery and the fortified walls

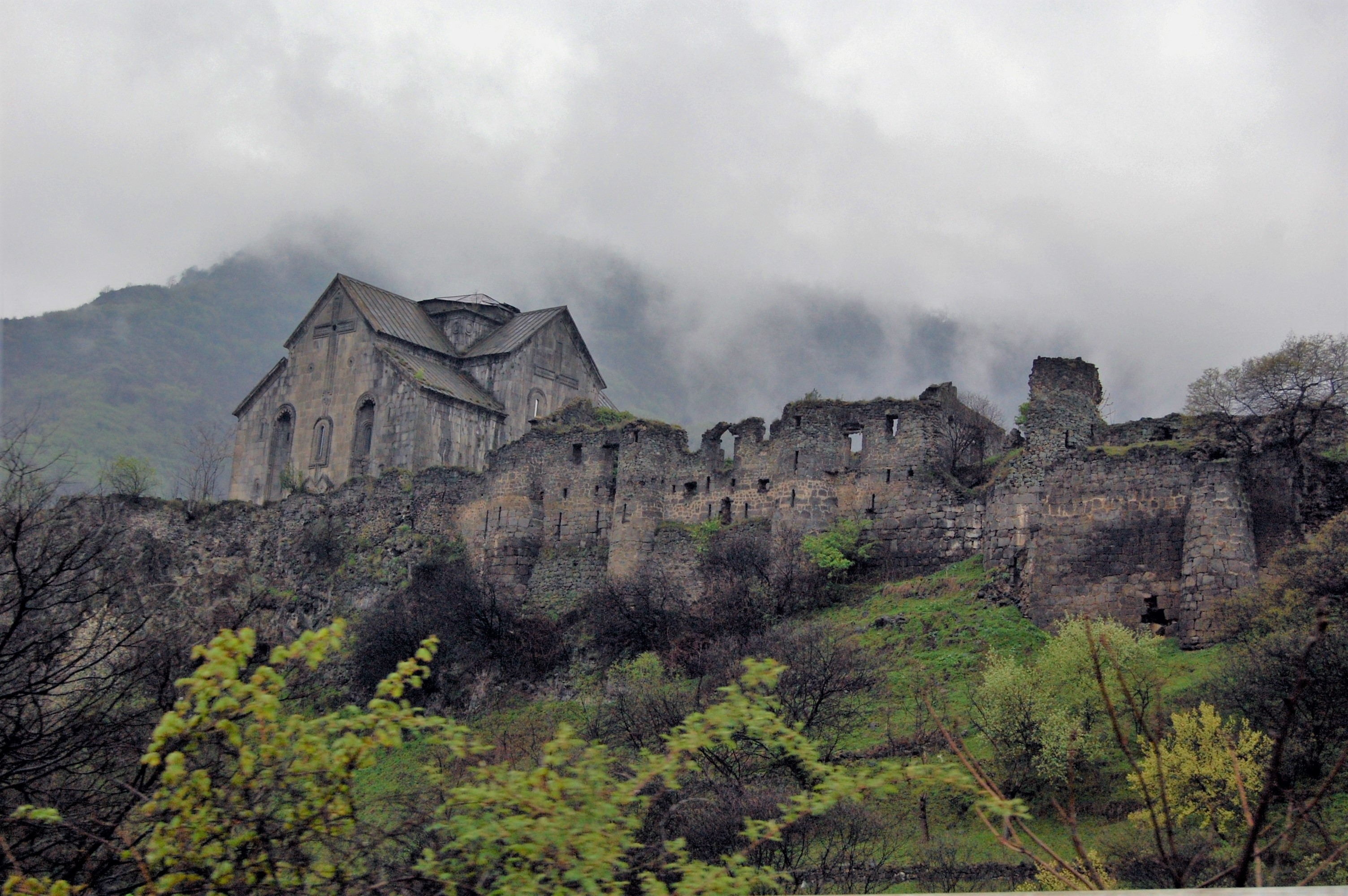
Fortress wall and Surb Astvatsatsin, view from the road

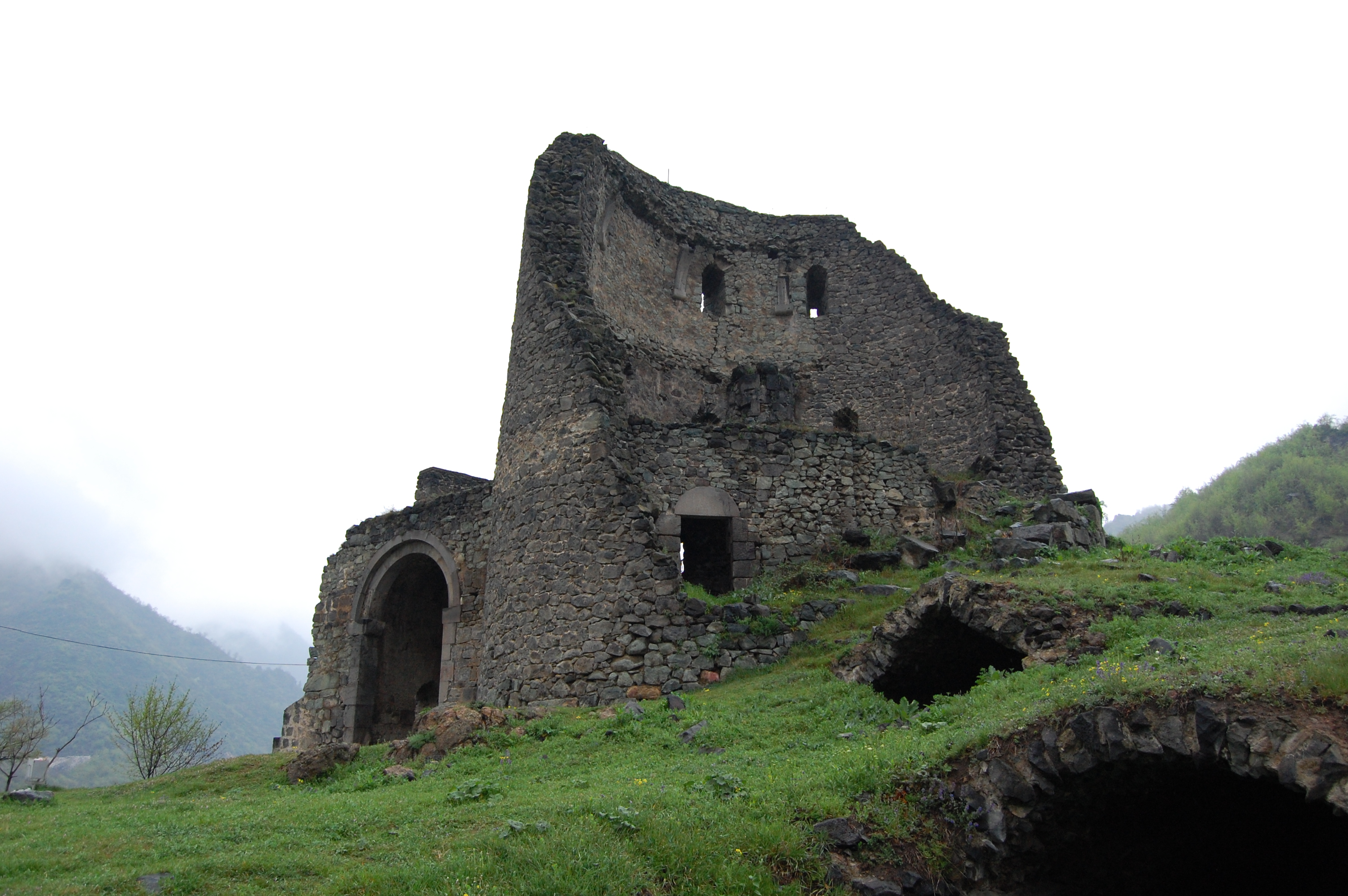
Half-ruined fortress wall

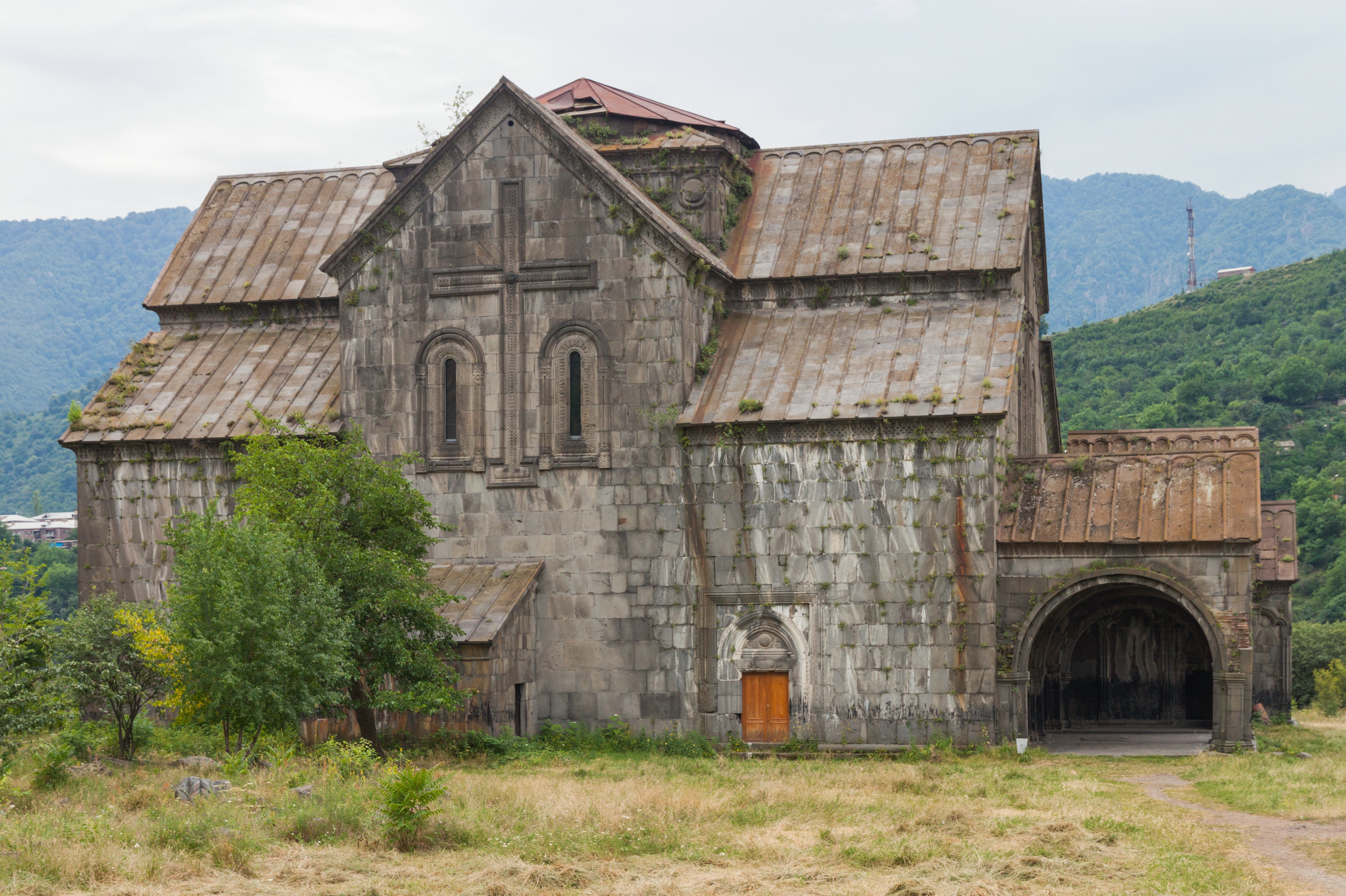

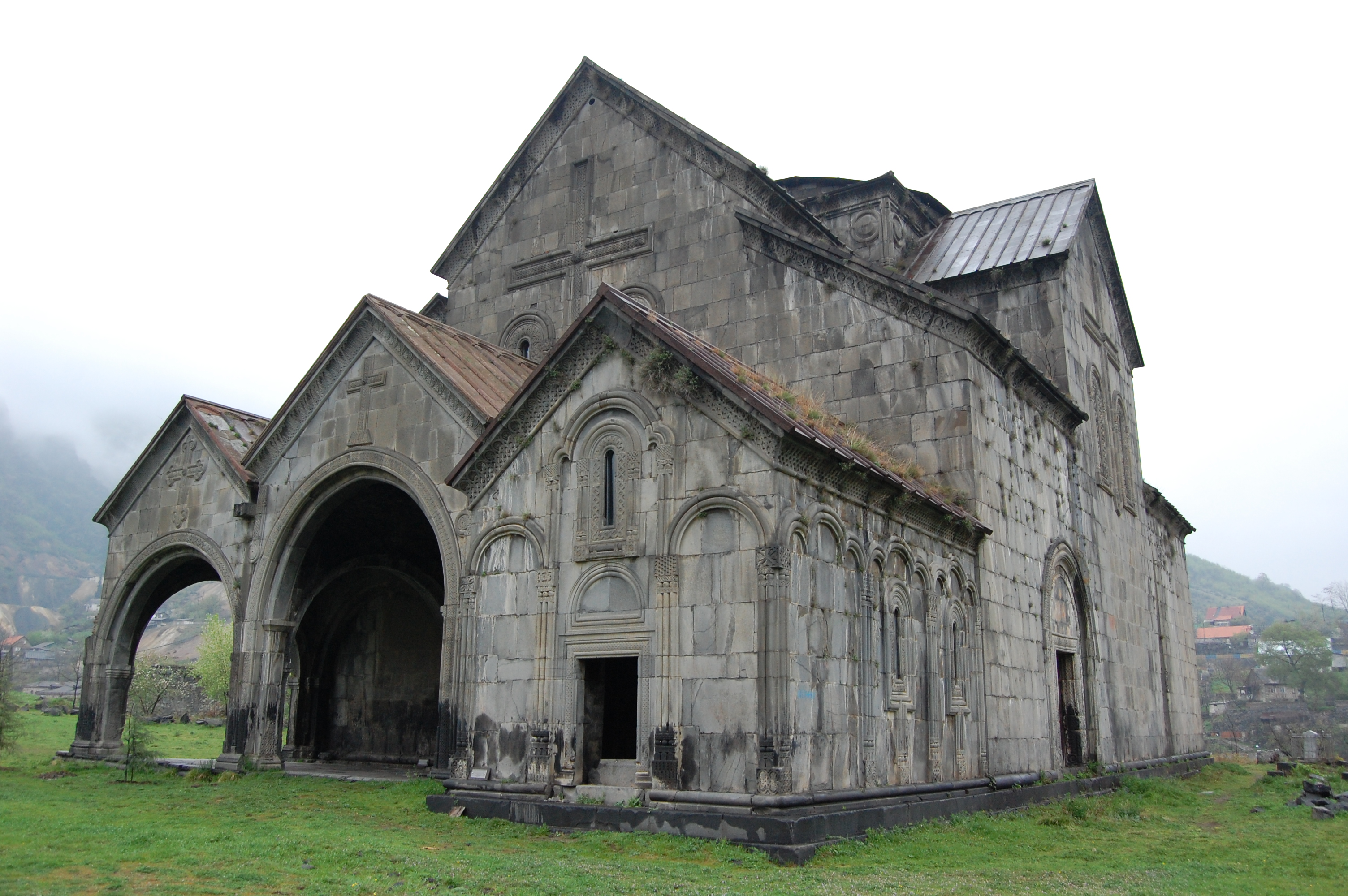
Western and southern facades of Surb Astvatsatsin

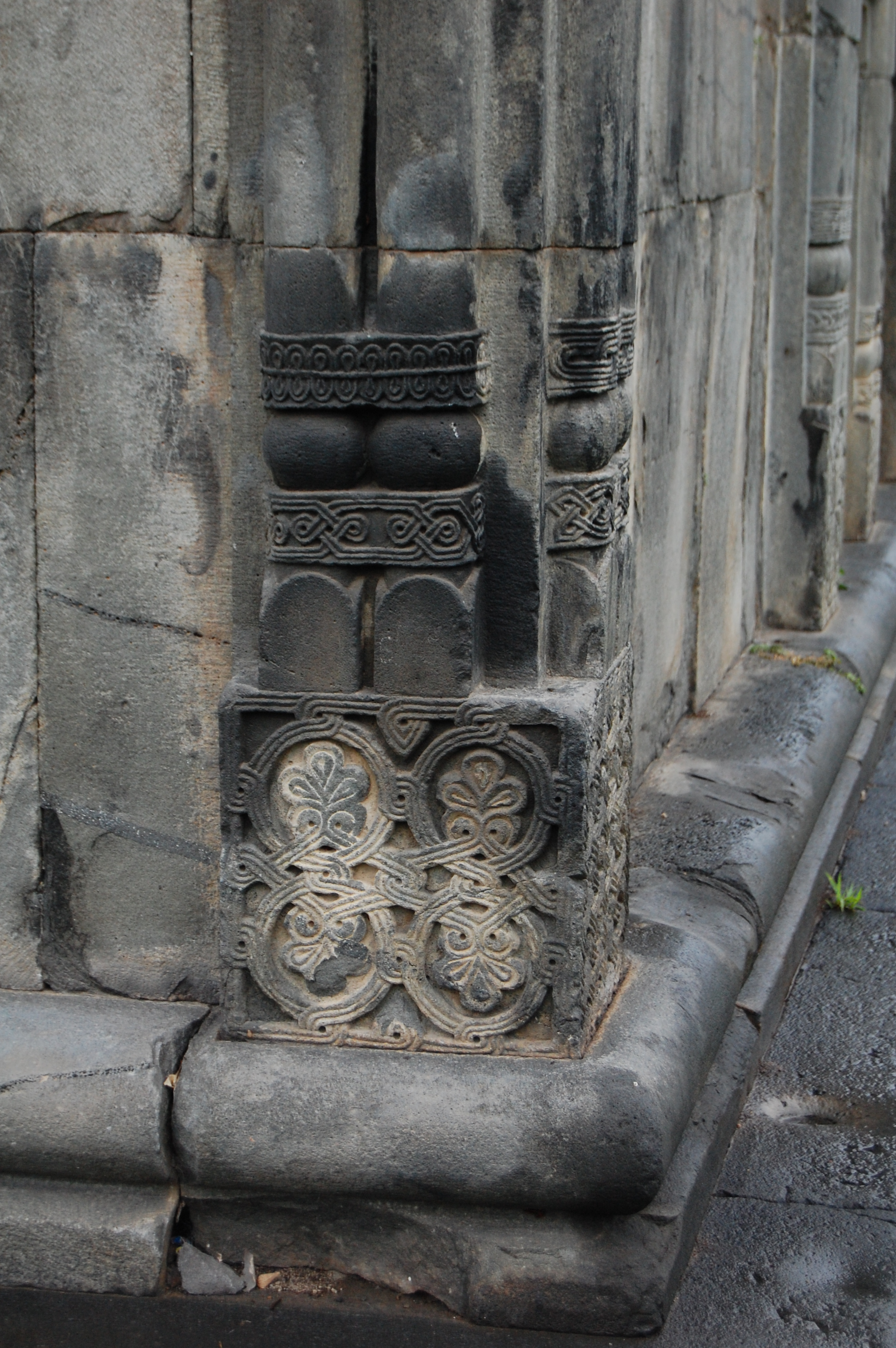
Western facade fragment

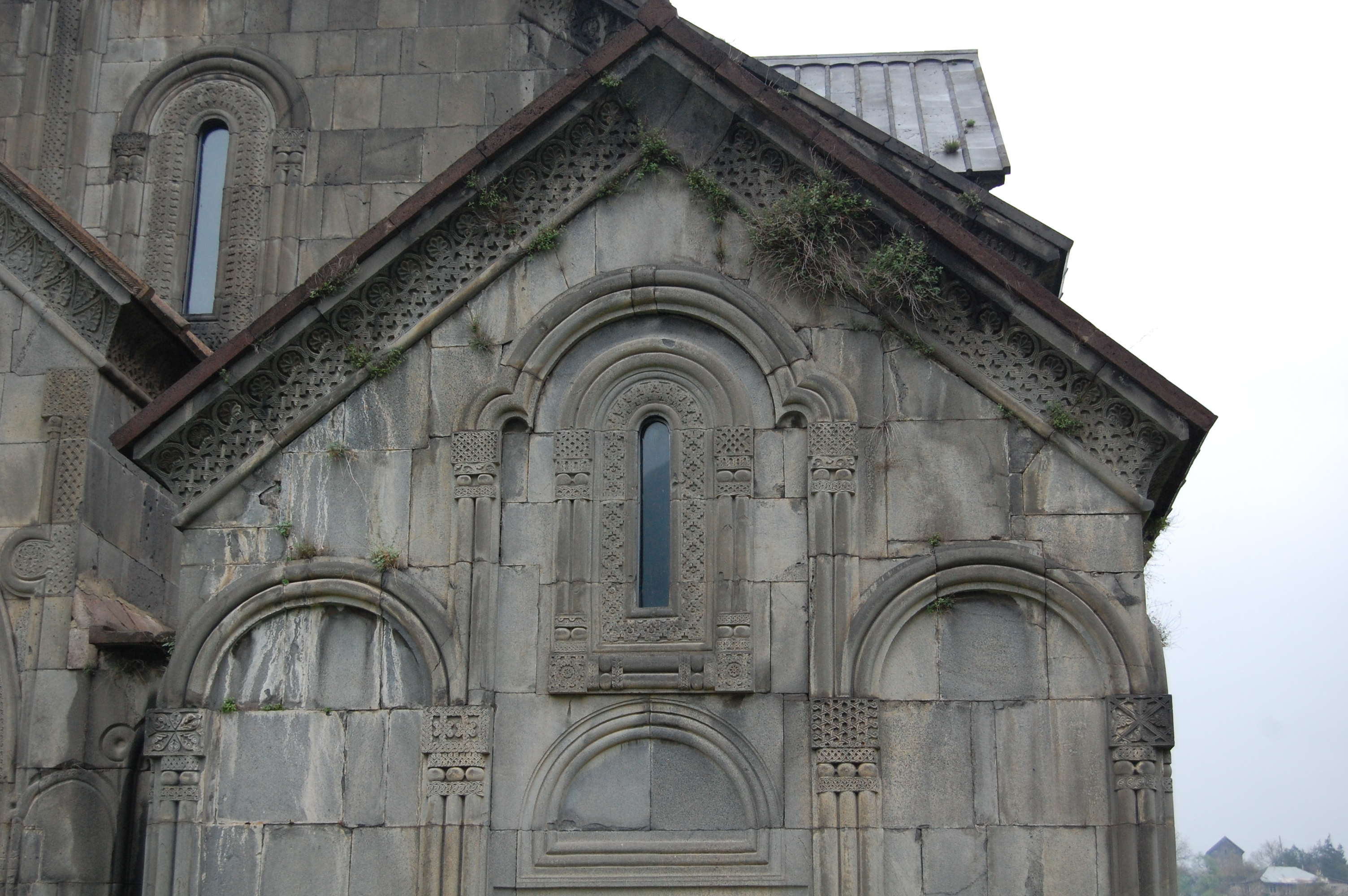
Western facade fragment

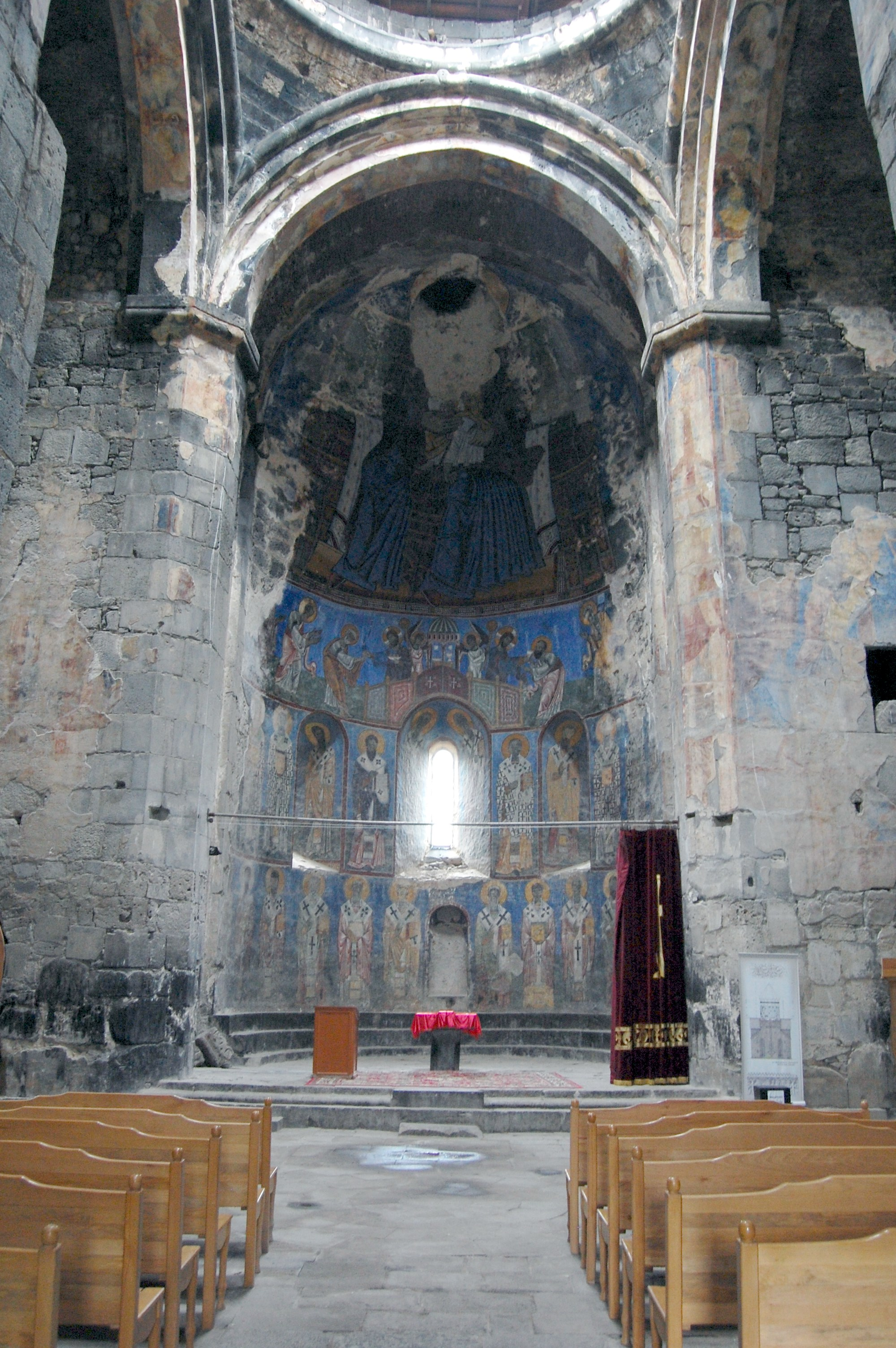
Altar and murals on the eastern wall

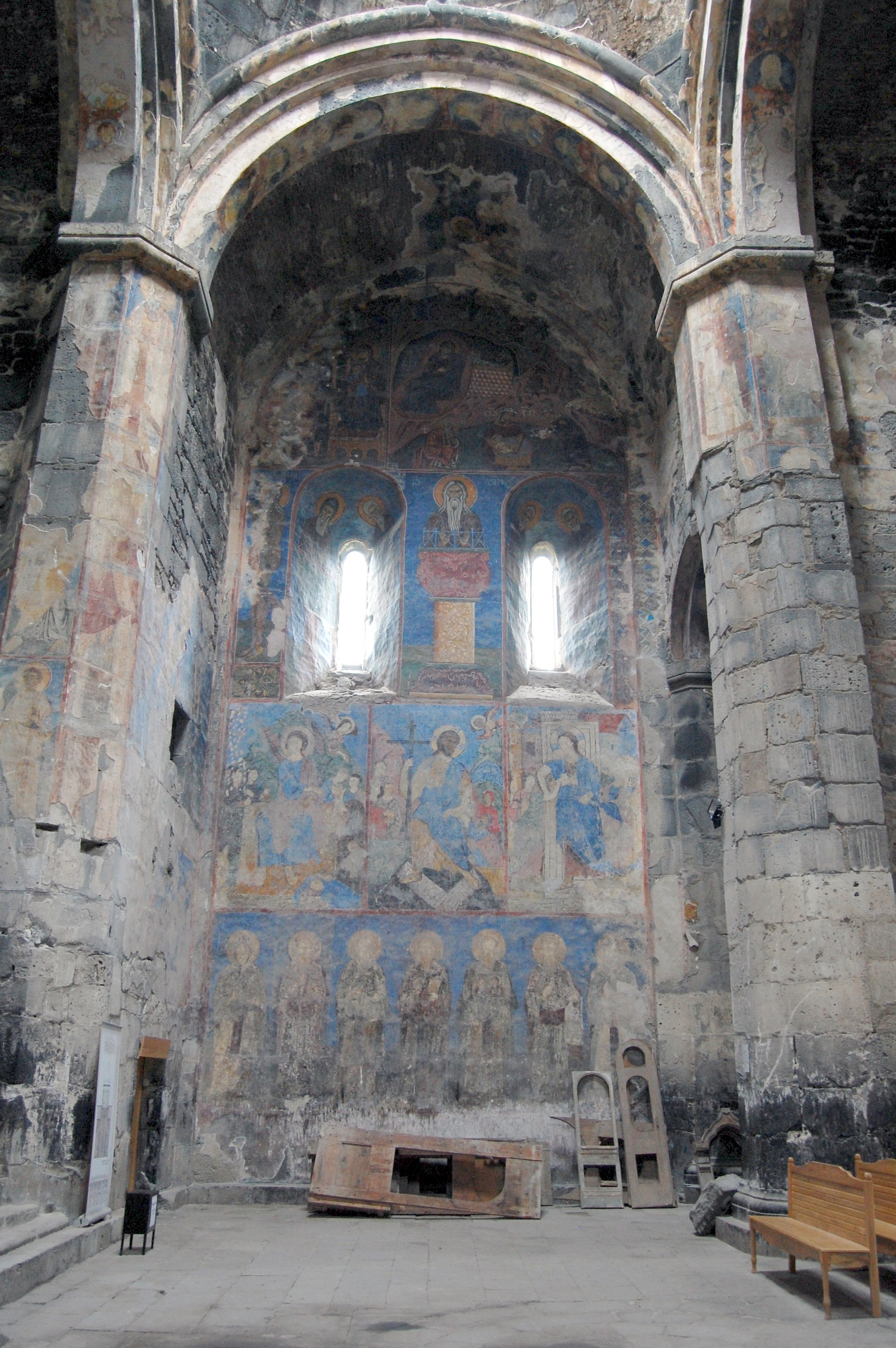
Murals on the southern wall

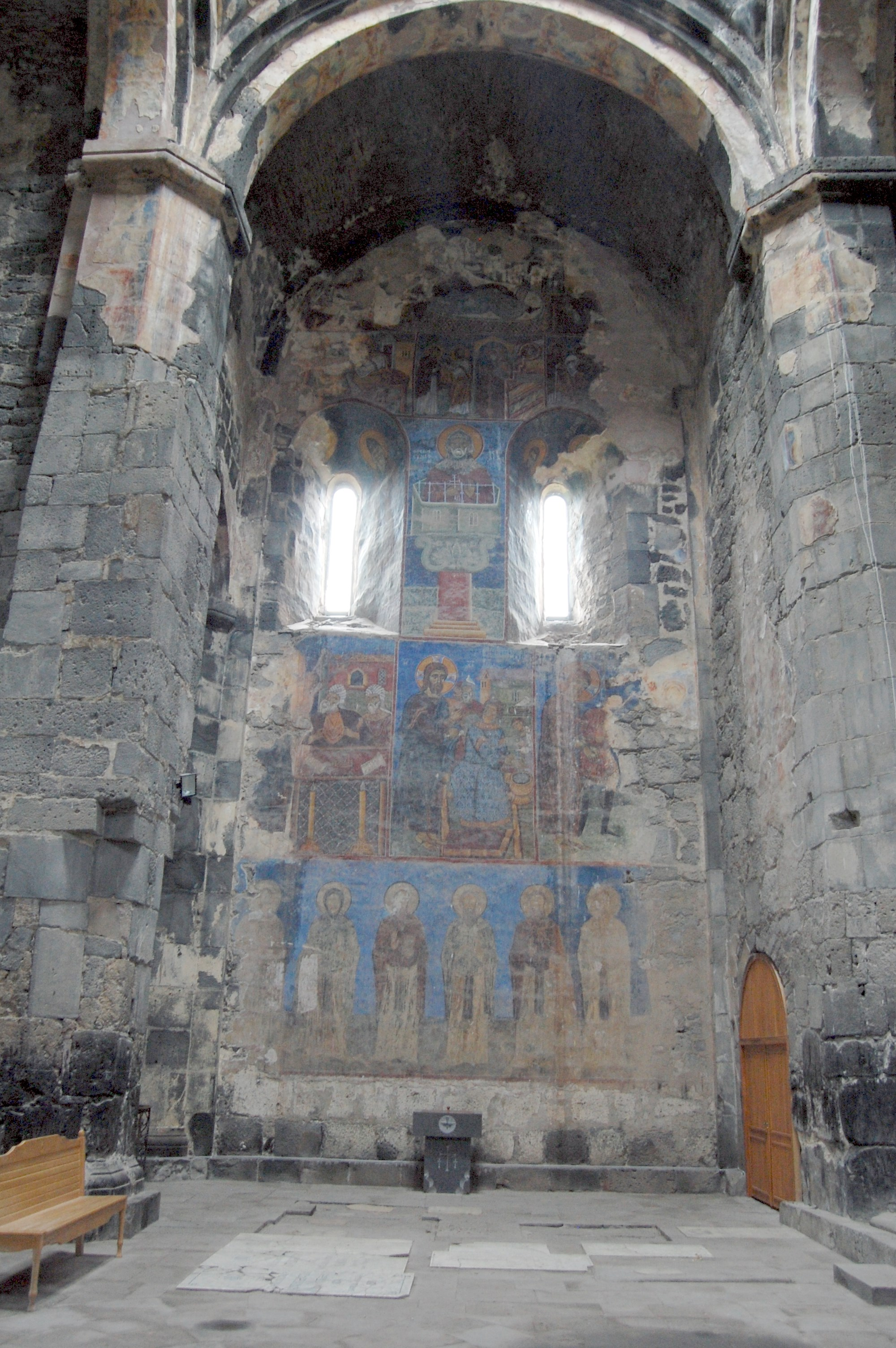
Murals on the northern wall

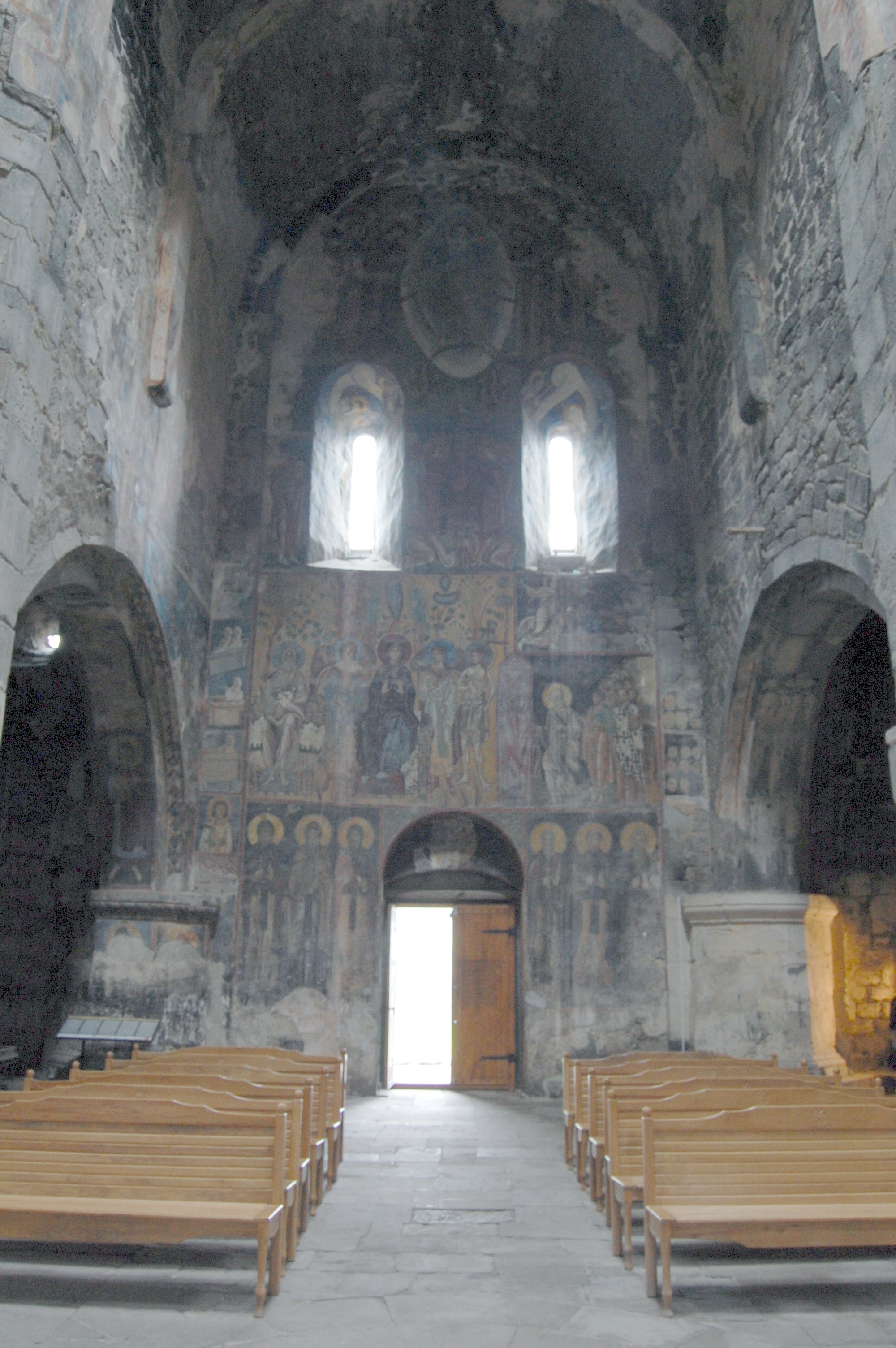
Murals on the western wall

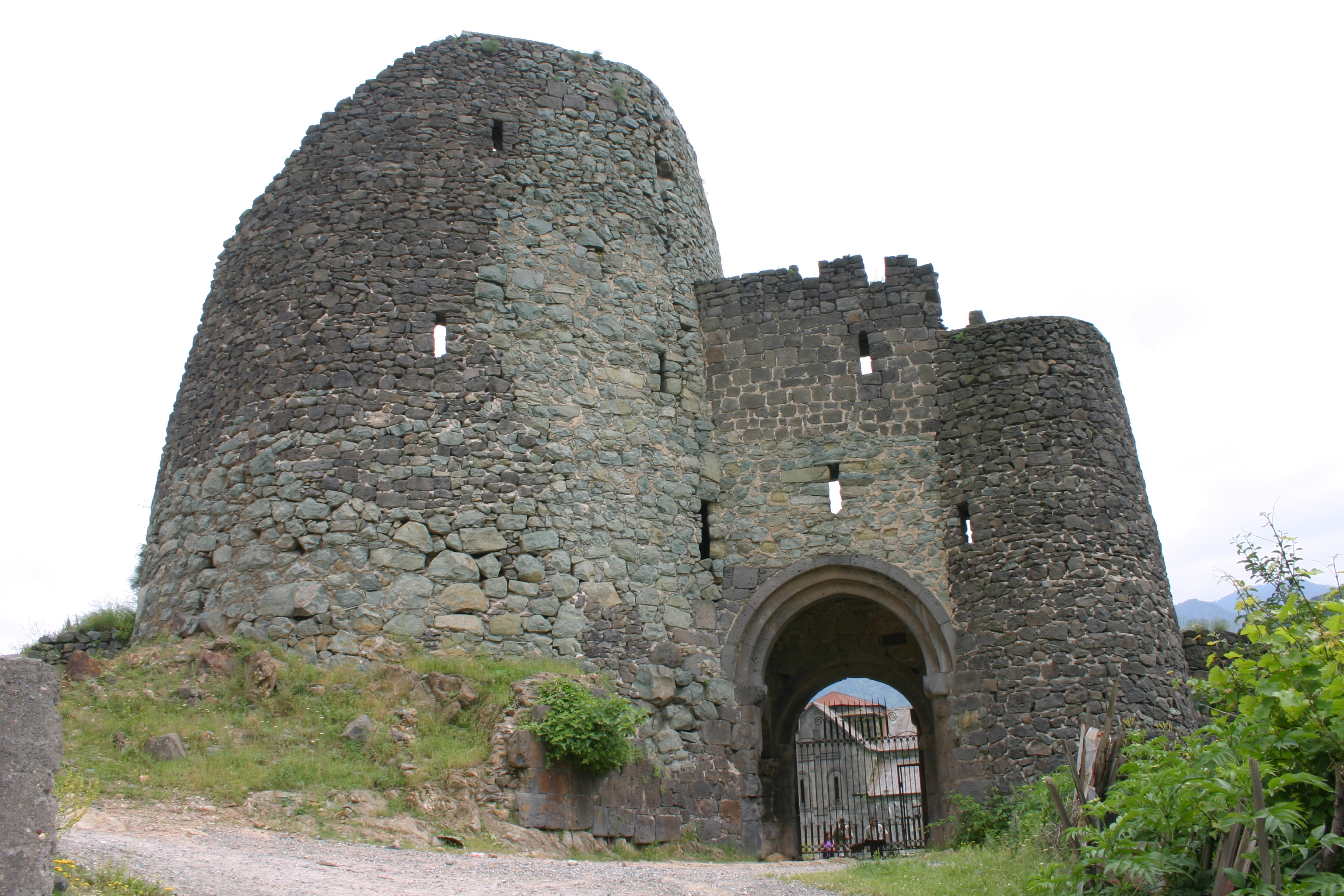
Northern side of the northern wall. The only entrance to the compound

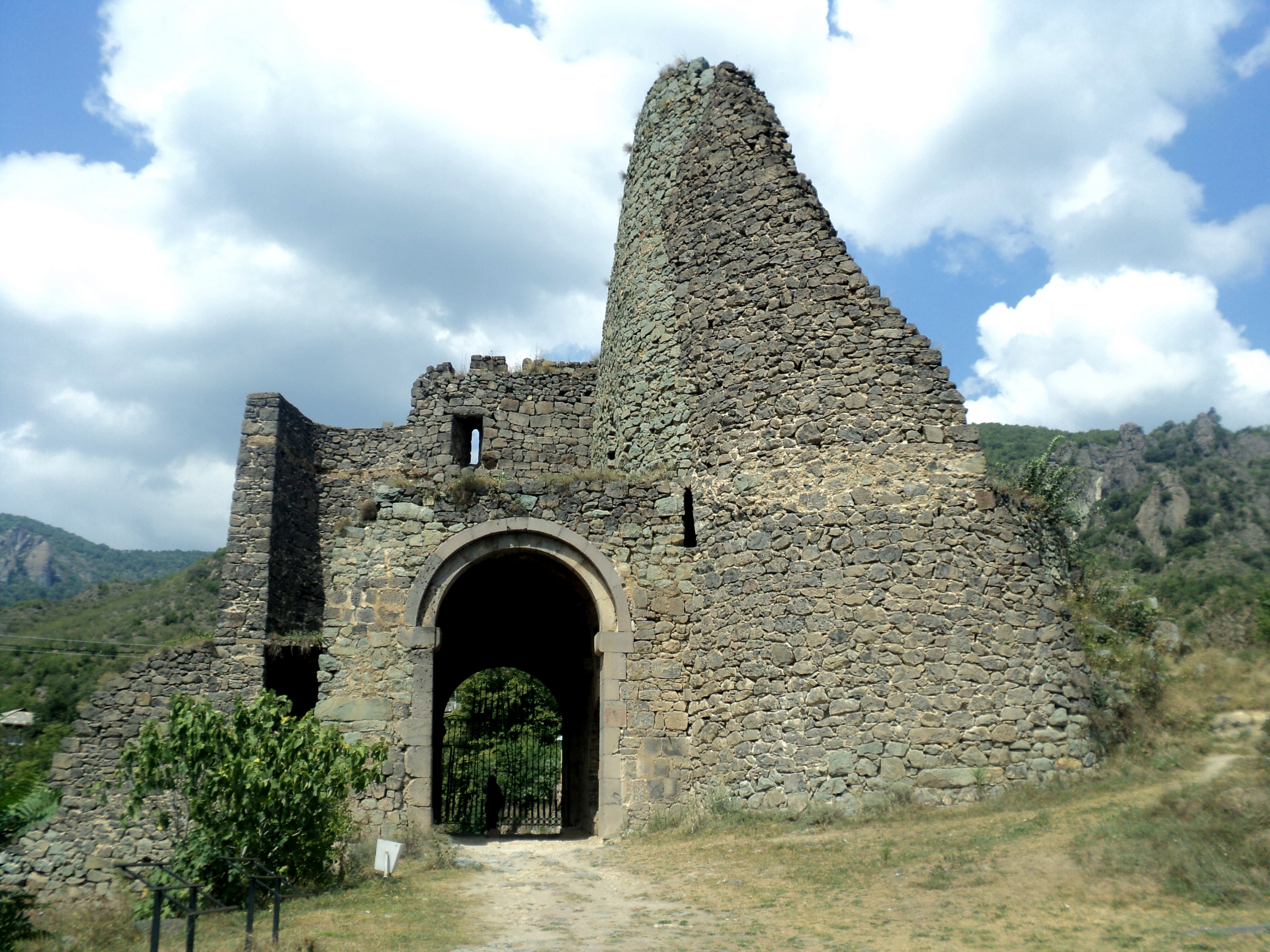
Southern side of the northern wall

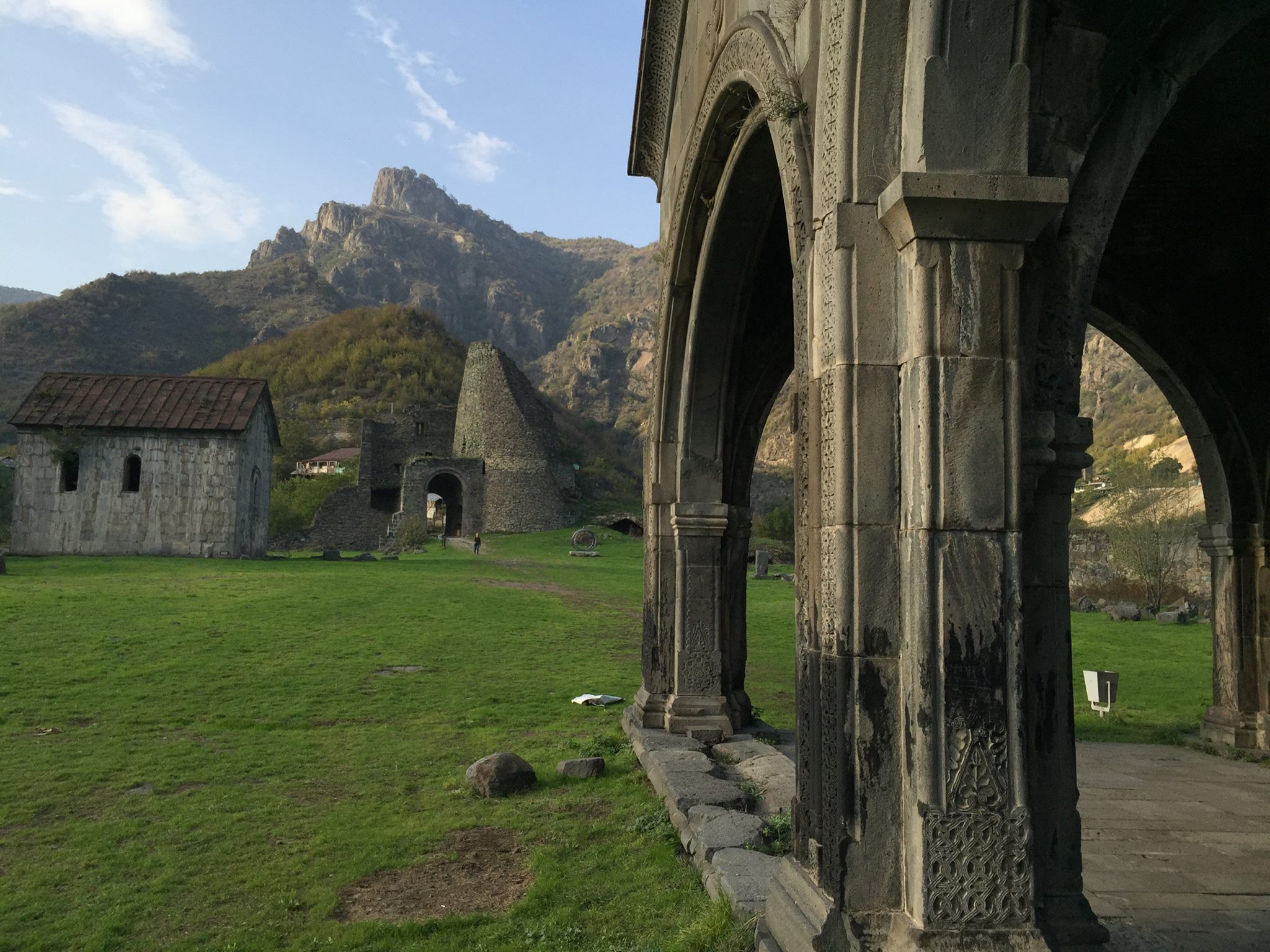
Looking towards the gate

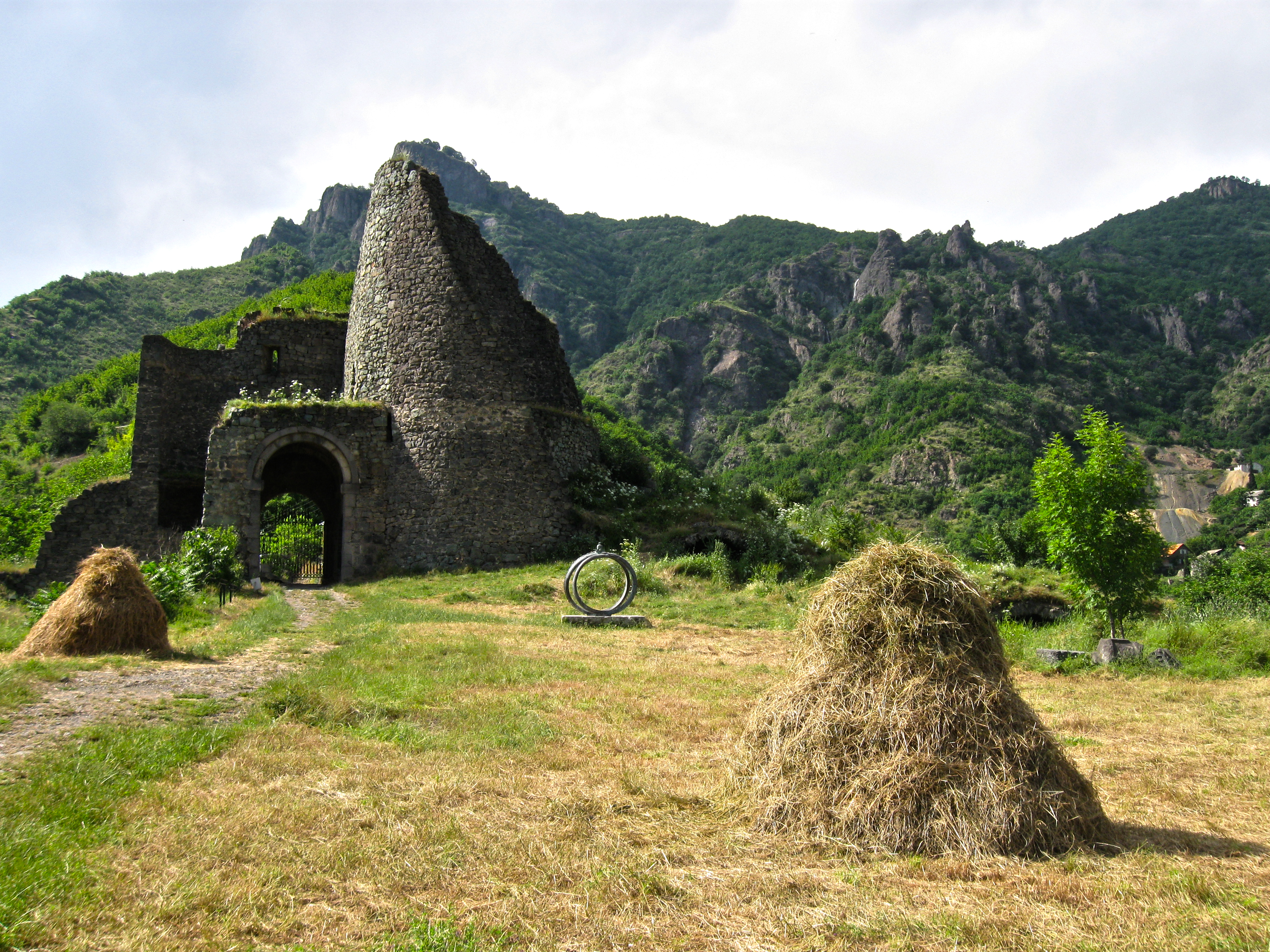
Southern side of the northern wall

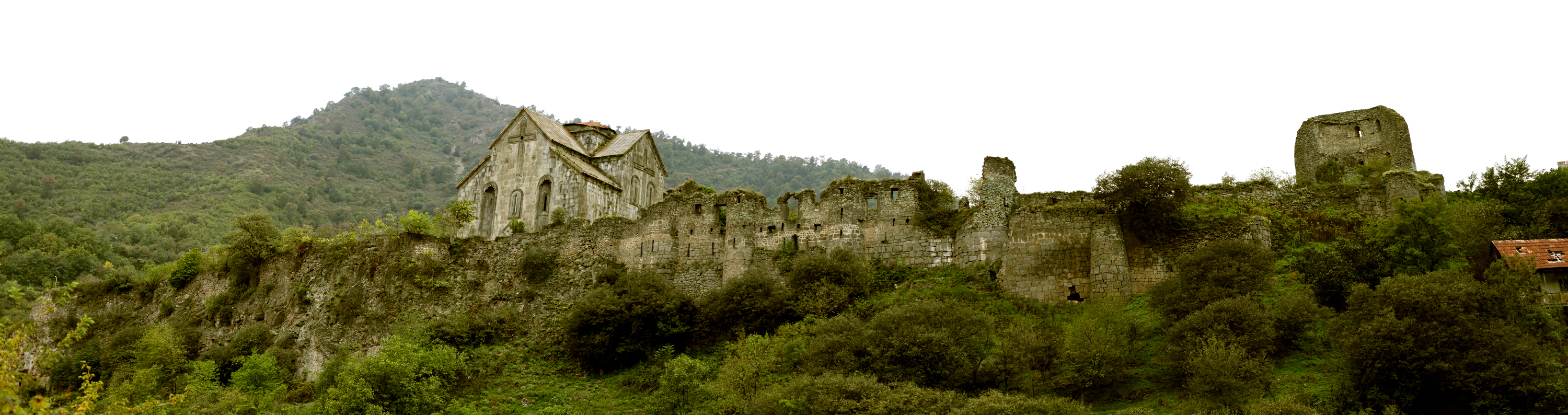
Fortress wall and Surb Astvatsatsin

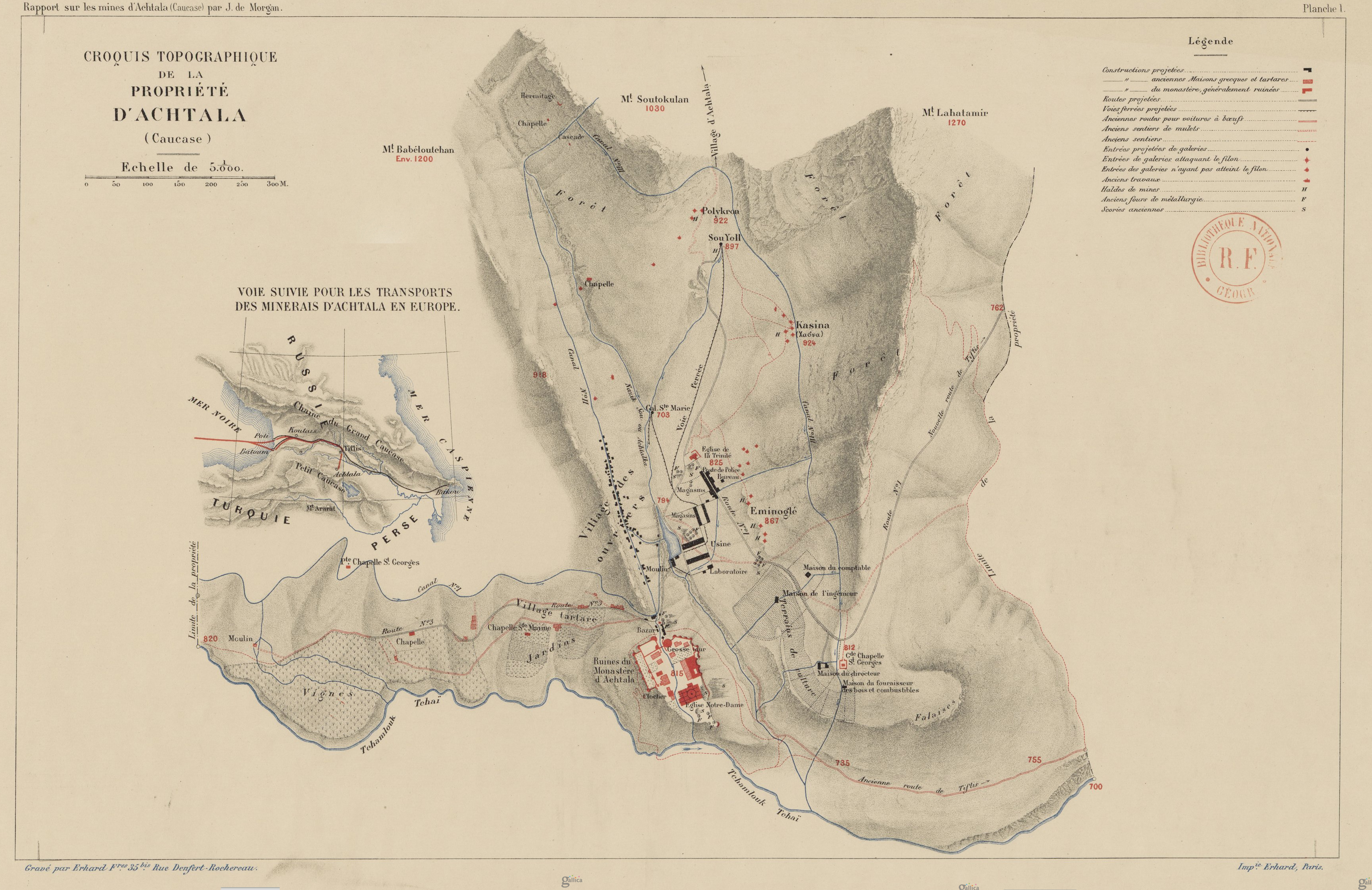
Akhtala map (1886)
