= Jacob I the Learned =

Armenian religious figure

Catholicos Jacob I the Learned was the Catholicos of the Armenian Apostolic Church between 1268 and 1286.

The pontifical throne was vacant for a few months after the death of Constantine I until it was filled by Jacob I from the region of Tarsus or Sis. He took up residence at the Catholicos's palace of Hromkla. He had been the author of many works and of hymns as well. Shortly after his election he transcribed the general epistle of Nerses IV the Graceful and sent copies of it to places throughout his jurisdiction. In 1270 King Hetoum I abdicated and Catholicos Jacob crowned his son Leo II of Armenia. Catholicos Jacob died in 1286 during a difficult period as a plague had recently broken out and a famine ensued. He was succeeded on Good Friday that year by Constantine II.

Preceded by Constantine I of Cilicia	Catholicos of the Holy See of Cilicia; 1268–1286	Succeeded by Constantine II the Woolmaker
