= Stephen IV of Cilicia =

Stephen IV of Cilicia was the Catholicos of the Armenian Apostolic Church between 1290 and 1293.

Stephen was from the village of Khakh in the province of Ekeliaz, but educated at Rumkale. He was elected to replace the banished Catholicos Constantine II the Woolmaker and was the last to reside at Hromkla. During his reign the Mamalukes marched through the Holy Land against the Christians there and made their way up to Hromkla. After a long stand it was finally sacked with hundreds of residents massacred. Stephen was carried away as their captive and all the churches there were burned. A year into his captivity in Egypt Stephen is said to have died of grief. Soon after Armenia made peace with the Egyptians and the captives were released. Stephen was succeeded by Gregory VII of Cilicia who moved the pontifical residence to Sis as Hromkla had been destroyed.

Preceded by Constantine II the Woolmaker	Catholicos of the Holy See of Cilicia; 1290–1293	Succeeded by Gregory VII of Cilicia
