= Jacob II of Cilicia =

Armenian Catholicos in 14th century

Jacob II was the Catholicos of the Armenian Apostolic Church between 1327 and 1341, and then again between 1355 and 1359.

He was the nephew of a previous Catholicos, Gregory VII of Cilicia. During a Mamaluke invasion he and King Leo IV of Armenia got into a severe disagreement over how to deal with the situation. The dispute grew so large that Jacob threatened Leo with the vengeance of the church. Leo was so enraged by this that he had Jacob deposed from the pontificate. Mukhitar Ter Mukhik from the village of Curnah was elected pontiff in his place.

In 1347 the new King Constantine II, King of Armenia began a conversation with the pope in Avignon about religious affairs and sent former Catholicos Jacob on a mission to see Pope. Upon his return home Catholicos Mekhitar died, at which point Jacob was nominated to become Catholicos again. He died four years into his second reign.

Preceded by Constantine III of Cilicia	Catholicos of the Holy See of Cilicia; 1327–1341	Succeeded by Mekhitar I of Cilicia

Preceded by Mekhitar I of Cilicia	Catholicos of the Holy See of Cilicia; 1355–1359	Succeeded by Mesrob I of Cilicia
