= Constantine III of Cilicia =

Constantine III of Lampron was the Catholicos of the Armenian Apostolic Church between 1323 and 1326.

A short time after his election he traveled to Aleppo and there was invited to meet the Mamaluke sultan of Egypt Al-Nasir Muhammad. He was received with much honor and was able to persuade the sultan to make peace with Armenia. They signed a fifteen-year peace treaty, and Constantine returned to a rejoicing Sis.

Preceded by Constantine II the Woolmaker	Catholicos of the Holy See of Cilicia; 1323–1326	Succeeded by Jacob II of Cilicia
