= Gregory VII of Cilicia =

Armenian priest

Gregory VII Anavardzetzi was the Catholicos of the Armenian Apostolic Church between 1293 and 1307.

Gregory succeeded Stephen IV who died in captivity in Egypt. The location of the Holy See at Rumkale had recently been destroyed by the Mamalukes invasion and so Gregory moved the See to Sis. During this period a rival Catholicos reigned at Akhtamar and King Hethoum II lifted excommunication on that group and decreed that both Akhtamar and Cilician Sees would have distinct power in their own regions. Catholicos Gregory was on very good terms with his counterpart at Akhtamar. Gregory was said to have been very meek and gentle. He tried to bring the Armenian Church into line with the Greeks, an always very controversial issue which caused much discontent towards him. Near the end of his reign the kingdom was in an era of peace, so Gregory saw it as an opportunity to propose better regulations for ecclesiastical customs and ceremonies. He composed a religious creed which he gave to King Levon III but then suddenly took ill and died.

The king convened the head of clergy throughout the land to go to Sis where Gregory's creed was read and certain canons enacted, one of which acknowledged the dual-nature of Christ, a belief from the Greek church which had long made the Armenian church opposed to it as the Armenian church was miaphysite. This meeting also elected a new Catholicos, Constantine II the Woolmaker.

Gregory was the uncle of another Catholicos, Jacob II of Cilicia.

Preceded by Stephen IV of Cilicia	Catholicos of the Holy See of Cilicia; 1293–1307	Succeeded by Constantine II the Woolmaker
