= Constantine II the Woolmaker =

Armenian religious figure

Constantine II the Woolmaker was the Catholicos of the Armenian Apostolic Church between 1286 and 1289, and then again between 1307 and 1322.

== Early life and education ==
He was from the village of Catuk, but as he was educated in Sis he was called Sisetzi. He was also surnamed Pronagorz, or Woolmaker.

== Work on throne ==
He came to the pontifical throne on Good Friday of 1286. A year later King Leo II of Armenia died and was succeeded by his son Hetoum II. Two years later a great disagreement took place between the King and Catholicos on the topic of union with the Roman Catholic Church, which grew to the point where the king convened a meeting of the clergy which deposed Constantine. He was banished after reigning for three years.

Almost two decades later, upon the death of Gregory VII of Cilicia, a meeting was called by King Levon III to discuss new church regulations proposed by the recently deceased Catholicos. At this same meeting Constantine II was reinstated as Catholicos. Towards the end of his second reign the Mamlukes, with their allies the Turks, marched into Cilicia and laid siege to the region. Much of it was left in desolation and many were carried away into captivity. Constantine wrote to Pope John XXII for aid, to which he responded with consolation and some money. Scythian troops were sent to protect Cilicia but before they arrived the region was invaded again and much of the Armenian army was killed fighting them. Constantine was very distressed by these events and died, in 1322.

Preceded by Jacob I the Learned	Catholicos of the Holy See of Cilicia; 1286–1289	Succeeded by Stephen IV of Cilicia

Preceded by Gregory VII of Cilicia	Catholicos of the Holy See of Cilicia; 1307–1322	Succeeded by Constantine III of Cilicia
