= Church of the Holy Cross, Aleppo =

Armenian Catholic church in Aleppo, Syria

Holy Cross Church
- Սուրբ Խաչ كنيسة الصليب المقدس
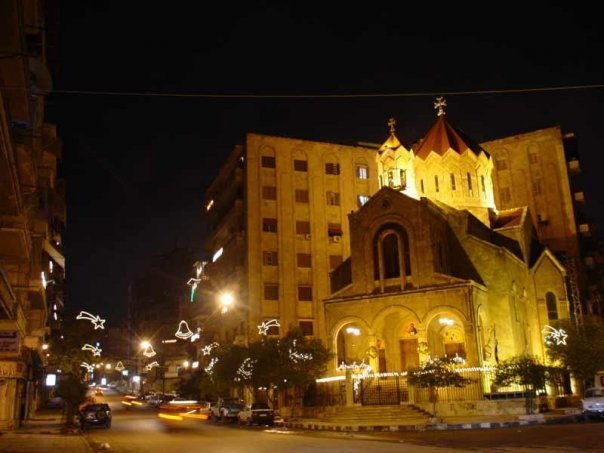
- Holly Cross Church during Christmas, December 2007

- Location in Aleppo

Religion
- Affiliation: Armenian Catholic Church; Armenian Catholic Archeparchy of Aleppo
- Region: Aleppo
- Year consecrated: 24 April 1993
- Status: Active

Location
- Location: Ouroubeh district, Addou'ali Street, Aleppo, Syria
- Coordinates: 36.2124°N 37.1553°E

Architecture
- Architect: Sarkis Balmanoukian
- Type: Armenian
- Style: Radial (Saint Hripsime-style)
- Completed: 1993
- Dome: 1

Church of the Holy Cross (Armenian: Սուրբ Խաչ, Sourp khach; Arabic: كنيسة الصليب المقدس) is an Armenian Catholic Church in the Ouroubeh district of Aleppo, Syria.

== Overview ==
The consecration of the church took place on 24 April 1993, on the 78 anniversary of the Armenian genocide. It is the work of the Aleppine-Armenian architect Sarkis Balmanougian. The church has a single dome with a belfry at the entrance.

During the Syrian Civil War and after the break-up of the Battle of Aleppo in 2012, the seat of the Armenian Catholic Archeparchy of Aleppo was temporarily moved to the Holy Cross Church, as the original seat of the diocese the Cathedral of Our Mother of Reliefs was frequently being shelled by the Islamist rebels.

As of April 2010, Father Nerses Zabbarian is the parish priest of Holy Cross church.

== Gallery ==
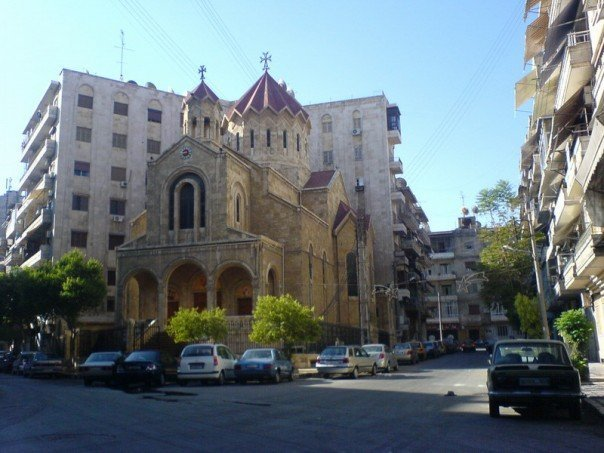
Day view of the church

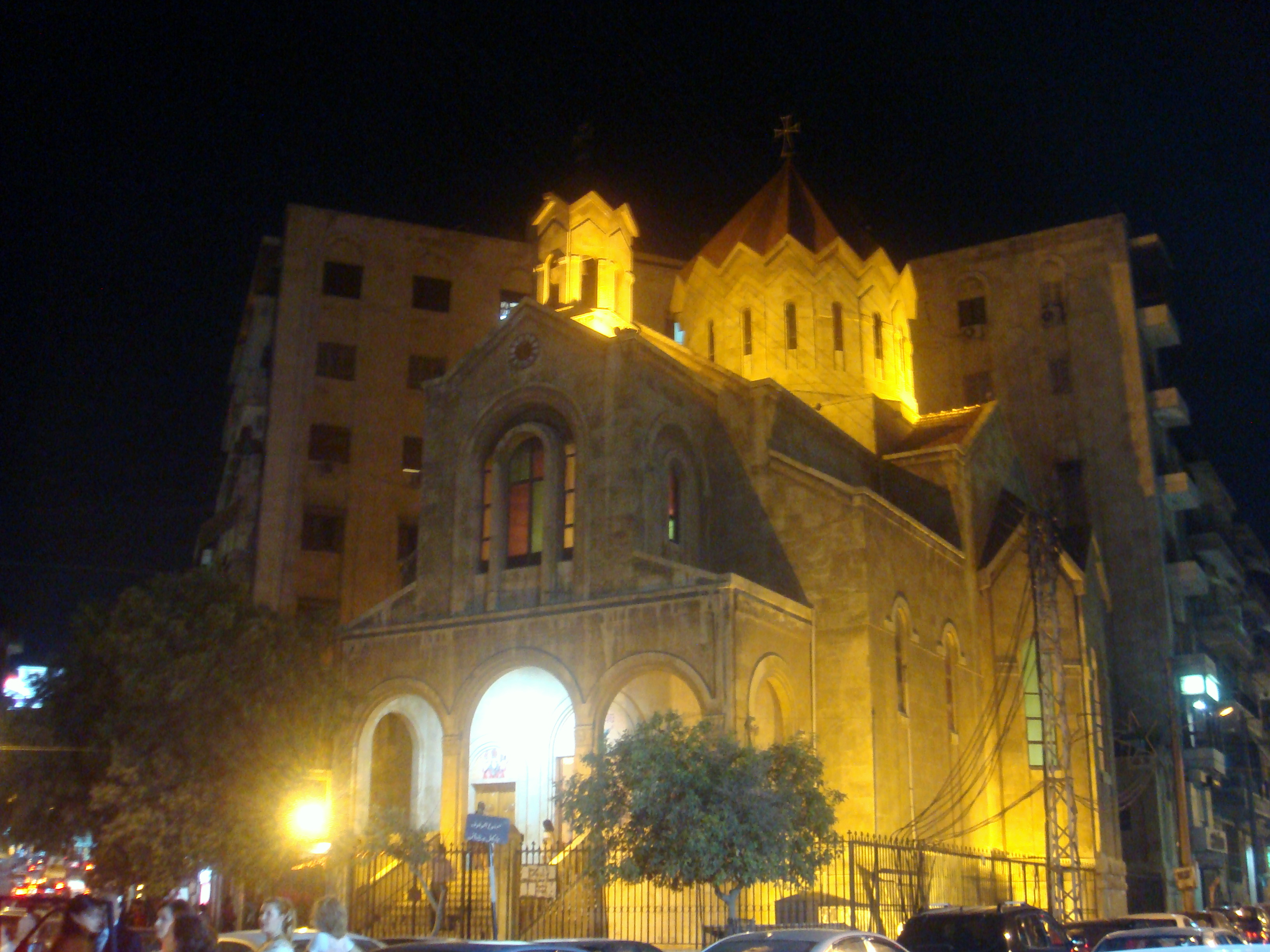
Night view of the church

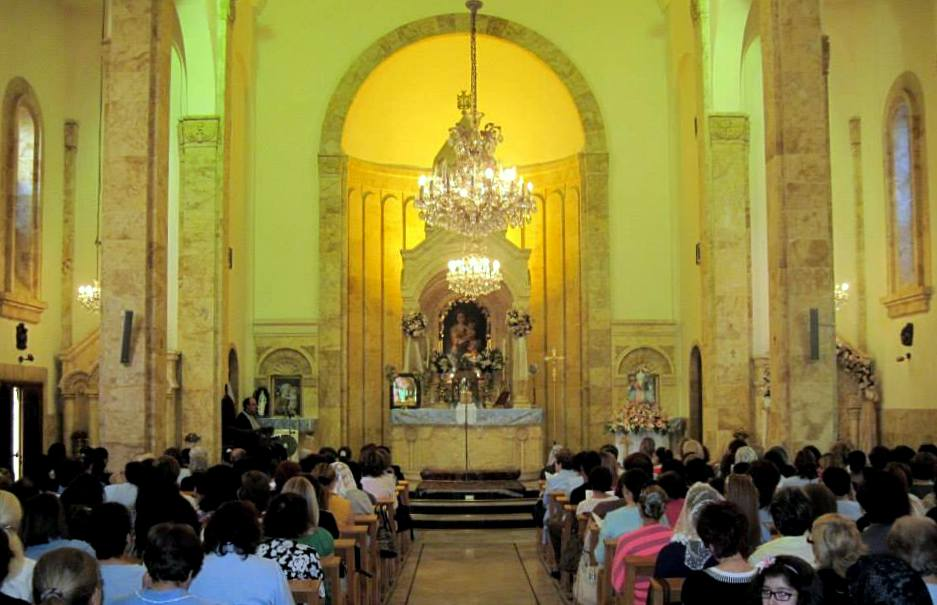
Interior view of the church

== See also ==
- Armenians in Syria
- Armenian Catholic Church
