= Paul Baghdadlian =

Armenian-Syrian musician

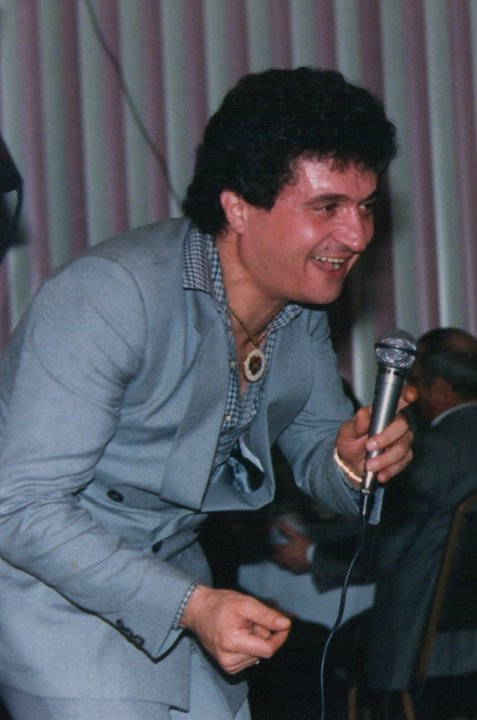

Background information
- Also known as: Paul Baghdadlian
- Born: Krikor Baghdadlian; July 10, 1953; Aleppo, Syria
- Died: June 28, 2011 (aged 57) Glendale, California, U.S.
- Genres: Traditional, pop, patriotic, rebetiko, rabiz
- Occupations: Singer-songwriter, record producer, composer, musician, businessman
- Instrument: Vocals
- Years active: 1975–2011
- Labels: PE-KO Records; Parseghian Records; Hollywood Music Center; Verginie Records
- Website: Paul Baghdadlian on Facebook

Paul Baghdadlian (Armenian: Փոլ Բաղդադլյան; Western Armenian; Փօլ Պաղտատլեան; July 10, 1953 – June 28, 2011) was a Syrian and American singer, songwriter, record producer, composer, musician, and businessman of Armenian ancestry.

== Early life ==
Paul, originally named Krikor Baghdadlian, was born on July 10, 1953, in Aleppo, Syria. He was born to Baruyr and Arousiag Baghdadlian. Paul grew up with two brothers and a sister. In 1961, the Baghdadlian family moved to Kuwait. He had great success in singing modern Armenian music after moving to Beirut, Lebanon. In 1965, at the age of 12 his mother died (his father eventually remarried and settled in Pasadena, California). Struggling to live his daily life, he started performing to make his living.

== Career ==
During the early 1970s, Paul Baghdadlian was known as "Paul the Prince" and was singing only English songs. After listening to the music of fellow singer of the Armenian diaspora, Harout Pamboukjian, however, Paul started to sing in Armenian, mostly performing love songs.

Having achieved great success in Beirut and the Middle East in this new phase of his career, he moved to the United States, settling in Los Angeles, California, in 1977 for an international career. In Los Angeles, he produced hundreds of recordings, mostly ballads, most of which he sang in Armenian, though he sang in a number of other languages, most notably Arabic and English. Many of his songs were recorded and produced by Parseghian Records in Los Angeles.

He often toured the major centers of the Armenian diaspora and Armenia. On November 27, 2010, Paul Baghdadlian performed a concert in Laval, Canada. This concert happened to be his last prior to his death 7 months later.

== Death ==
Paul Baghdadlian died of lung cancer on June 28, 2011, after a long illness. He died in Glendale Adventist Medical Center, where he was being hospitalized. The cause of death was ruled to be respiratory failure due to the cancer.

== Discography ==
=== Studio albums ===
- Antzrev E Kalis (1976)
- Ourishin Yes (1978)
- Siroum Yem Kez (1979)
- Mor Sere (1979)
- The Last Tango (1980)
- Sbasoum Yem Kez (1980)
- Mareta (1980)
- Zavgis (1982)
- Sev Acher (1983)
- Miayn Ints Siree (1983)
- Arants Kez (1985)
- Siretzi Yes Megin (1987)
- Happy Birthday (1989)
- Naz Aghchig (1991)
- Sirem (1992)
- Ch’kideyi, Ch’kidem (1993)
- Garodi Harts E (1994)
- Gyanki Dzaghig (1995)
- Tou Im Ashkharn Es (1997)
- Kez Pari Louys (1998)
- Gyankes... (2000)
- Mortsir... (2001)
- Anoushig's (2004)
- Oor Es (2008)
- Hokis Im (2010)

=== Posthumous ===
- Hishadagner (2017)

=== Live albums ===
- Live in Beirut: Sona Chan (1981)
- Live in Australia (1988)
- Live in Damascus (1999)
- Live in Aleppo (2000)
- Azg Sireceq (2001)
- Live In Holland (2008)
- The King's Final Homecoming (2010)

=== Compilation albums ===
- Best of Paul (1998)
- Dance Party Mix (1998)
- Romantic Flashback (2000)
- The Very Best of Tangos (2000)
- Golden Mix (2000)
- Paylogh Asdgher (2005)
- Arabic Songs (2015)

=== Singles ===
- Mouraz (feat. Sammy Flash) (2016)
- Siretzi Yes Megin (feat. Super Sako) (2016)
- Happy Birthday (feat. Sammy Flash) (2017)
- Happy Birthday (feat. Sako Ghazarossian) (2017)
- Payts Apsos (feat. Joseph Krikorian) (2018)
- Sirelis Veratartsir (feat. DJ Hye FX/Harry Ohannessian) (2018)
- El Chem Timana (feat. Sarina Cross) (2018)
- Minchev Yerp (feat. Sammy Flash) (2019)
- Asa Asdvadz (feat. Sammy Flash) (2019)
- Yares Knatz (feat. Sammy Flash) (2020)
- Sirelis Veratartsir (feat. Sammy Flash) (2020)
- Harsntsou (Flashback Remix) (feat. DJ Hye FX/Harry Ohannessian) (2020)
- Nerir Indz Yare (feat. Anush Petrosyan) (2020)
- Sirelem Sirelem (Groove Remix) (feat. DJ Hye FX/Harry Ohannessian) (2020)
- Sirun Aghchig (feat. DJ Hye FX/Harry Ohannessian) (2022)
- Yerazis Metch (feat. DJ Hye FX/Harry Ohannessian) (2022)
- Tjvar Eh (feat. DJ Hye FX/Harry Ohannessian) (2024)

=== As a featured artist ===
- Sirel Em Kez (compilation album with Harout Pamboukjian & Varoujan Manoukian) (1981)
- Angeghdz Ser (compilation album with Harout Pamboukjian & Varoujan Manoukian) (1981)
- Payts Tou Chgas (compilation album with Harout Pamboukjian & Varoujan Manoukian) (1981)
- Tartsel Ourishin (feat. Paul Baghdadlian Jr.) (2002)
- Meghk (feat. Joseph Krikorian) (2002)
- Heranumes (feat. Aram Asatryan, album Aram Asatryan & Friends: 50 Golden Years) (2003)
- Arev Tartsar (feat. Aram Asatryan, album Aram Asatryan & Friends: 50 Golden Years) (2003)
- Srdis Takouhin (feat. Ararat Amadyan) (2007)
