= Khoren I Paroian =

Catholicos of the Holy See of Cilicia

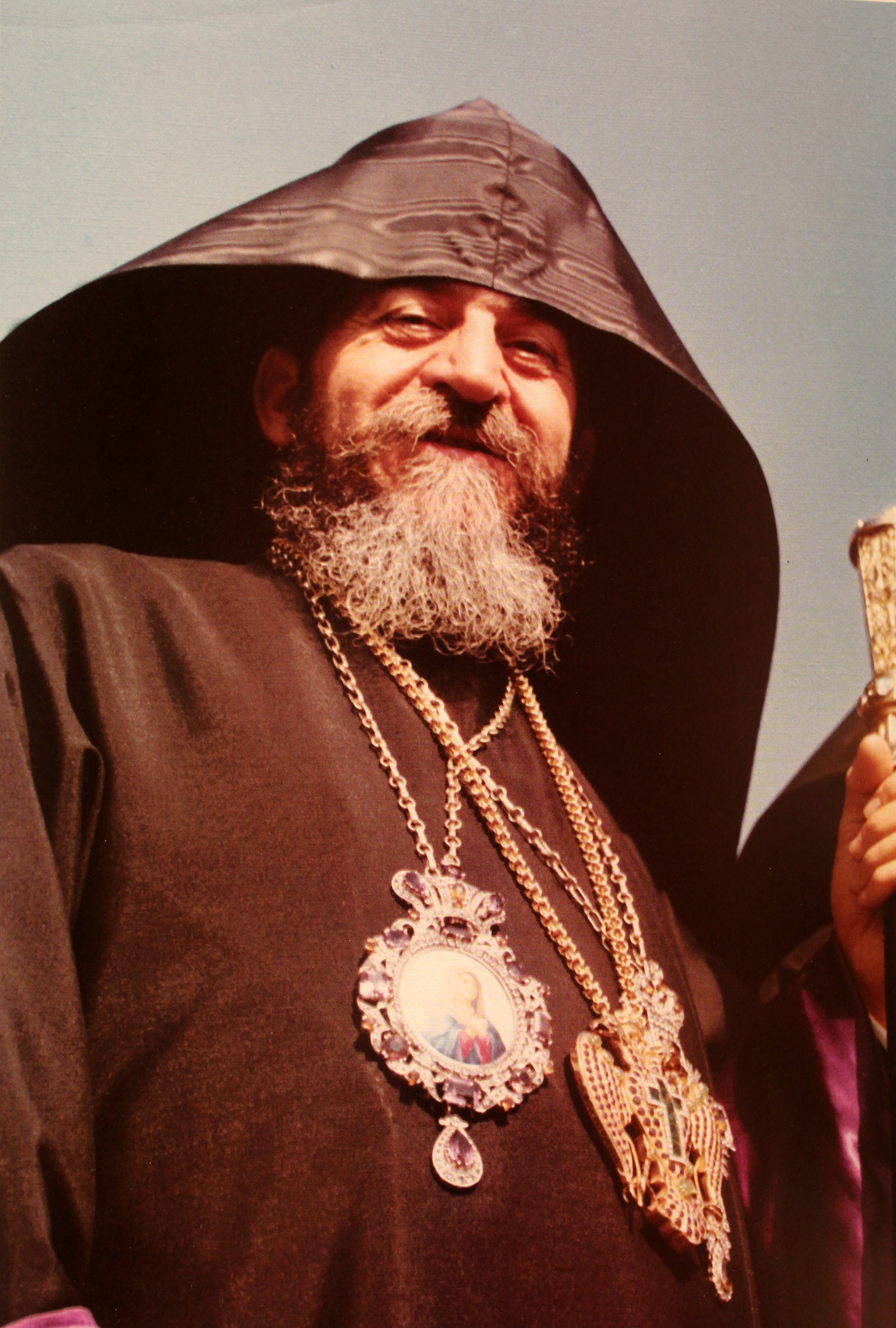
Khoren I

Khoren I Paroyian (Armenian: Խորէն Ա. Բարոյեան; 24 November 1914, in Nicosia – 9 February 1983, in Antelias) was the Catholicos of the Holy See of Cilicia, from 1963 to 1983.

He was born in Adalia, a settlement near the Magaravank in Cyprus with the birth name of Mesrob. He had four brothers and a sister. His parents were originally from Kharpert. After studies at the seminary in Antelias, he was ordained a celibate priest in 1937, taking the name Khoren. He was consecrated bishop in 1947, leading the church in Lebanon from 1951.

He was elected as Catholicos on 12 May 1963 after the death of Zareh I.

In 1977, because of his poor health, Catholicos Khoren I decided to have a Coadjutor to ensure that after his death there would be no disruption in the management of the church. Karekin Sarkisian, the archbishop and Pontifical Legate of the Eastern Prelacy of the United States was elected as Catholicos Coadjutor (in Armenian աթոռակից կաթողիկոս), a post the latter served assisting Catholicos Khoren I in his duties.

Upon the death of Khoren I, Karekin was installed as Catholicos Karekin II of Cilicia.

== See also ==
- List of Armenian Catholicoi of Cilicia

Preceded by Zareh I	Catholicos of the Holy See of Cilicia; 1963–1983	Succeeded by Karekin II (Cilicia)
