= Catholicos Karekin of Armenia =

There are three Armenian Catholicoi called Karekin:

== Catholicoi of all Armenians ==
- Karekin I (1932–1999), Catholicos from 1994 to 1999
- Karekin II (1951- ) Catholicos from 1999 - present

== Catholicoi of Cilicia ==
- Karekin I (Cilicia) (1943–1952)
- Karekin II (Cilicia) (1932–1999), Catholicos from 1983 to 1994), later Karekin I Catholicos of All Armenians (see above)
