= Meghrig Parikian =

Armenian bishop (1968–2021)

His Grace Meghrig Parikian
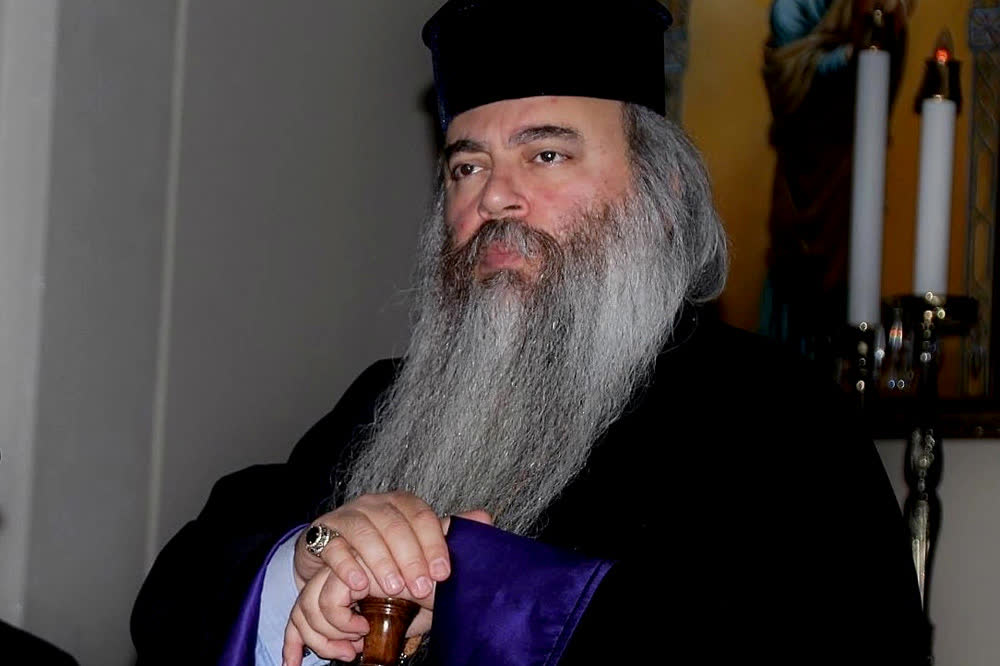
- Church: Armenian Apostolic Church
- See: Holy See of Cilicia

Personal details
- Born: Garabed Parikian; 3 January 1968 Beirut, Lebanon
- Died: January 16, 2021 (aged 53) Beirut, Lebanon
- Buried: Holy See of Cilicia
- Denomination: Armenian Apostolic

Meghrig Parikian (Armenian: Մեղրիկ Բարիքեան) (3 January 1968 – 16 January 2021) was an Armenian bishop who served in the Armenian Apostolic Church under the jurisdiction of the Holy See of Cilicia. Parikian was the Dean of the Armenian Theological Seminary in Bikfaya, Lebanon. Meghrig Parikian was also a musician and composer who had studied at Juilliard and the Mannes School of Music in New York.

== Priesthood ==
Parikian was appointed the parish priest of St. Mary Armenian Apostolic Church in Toronto in 2002. In 2014 he was ordained as a bishop, and then elected as Prelate of the Armenian Prelacy of Canada by the lay council on May 10, 2014.

== Death ==
Parikian died of COVID-19 on January 16, 2021. His final unction was held on January 17, 2021, at St. Gregory the Illuminator Armenian Cathedral in Antelias, Lebanon. He was buried in the Holy See of Cilicia Brotherhood Cemetery in the Catholicosate of Cilicia.
