= Armenian Prelacy of Canada =

Armenian Prelacy of Canada Գանատայի Հայոց Թեմ

Location
- Country: Canada

Statistics
- Population: Total: (as of 2006); 50,500
- Churches: 7
- Schools: 2

Information
- Denomination: Armenian Apostolic Church
- Established: 2002
- Cathedral: Sourp Hagop Armenian Cathedral, Montreal

Current leadership
- Patriarch: Aram I
- Prelate: Archbishop Papken Tcharian
- Vicar General: Right Reverend Father Keghart Kosbakian

Website
- Official web

The Armenian Prelacy of Canada (Armenian: Գանատայի Հայոց Թեմ), is a diocese of the Armenian Apostolic Church affiliated with the Holy See of Cilicia, formed in 2002. The prelacy building is located at 3401 Oliver Asselin in Montreal, Quebec, Canada.

As of 2016, the diocese has 7 churches under its jurisdictions. Archbishop Papken Tcharian is the primate of the Armenian Prelacy of Canada.

== History ==
In 1958 the Armenian Prelacy of America was established. There were only few churches, and the Prelacy included all of the United States of America and Canada. As the number of Churches grew over the years, the Armenian Prelacy of America was split into two jurisdictions, Eastern and Western. As years continued to go by, more churches were built, and in 2002 the Armenian Prelacy of Eastern America was split into two yet again, this time establishing the Armenian Prelacy of Canada.

== Churches ==
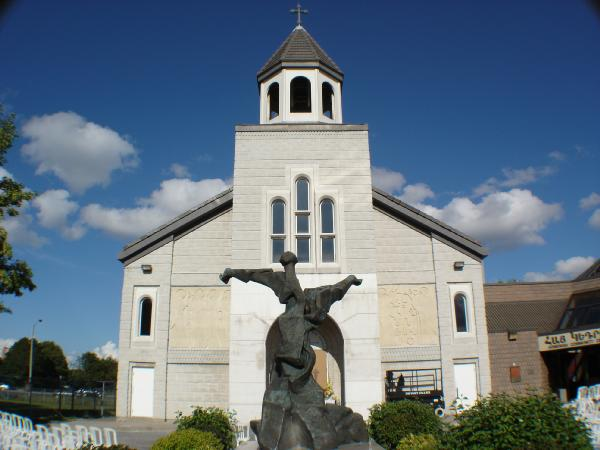
Holy Mother of God church of Toronto

As of 2016, the diocese has 8 churches under its jurisdiction:

- Saint Hagop Armenian Cathedral of Montreal, Quebec, headed by Archpriest Rev. Fr. Karnig Koyounian.
- Saint Kevork Armenian Church of Laval, Quebec, headed by Priest Rev Fr. Hagop Gyadayan.
- St. Mary Armenian Apostolic Church, Toronto, Ontario (opened in 1990). Headed by Priest Very Rev. Fr. Vartan Tashjian and Archpriest Rev. Fr. Datev Mikaelian.
- Saint Gregory the Illuminator Armenian Church of Vancouver, British Columbia, headed by Priest Very Rev. Fr. Karekin Shekherdemian.
- Saint Nshan Armenian Church of Cambridge, Ontario (opened in 1983), Headed by Right Rev. Father Keghart Kosbakian
- Saint Boghos Armenian Church of St. Catharines, Ontario. A visiting pastor celebrates Divine Liturgy.
- Saint Vartan Armenian Church of Winnipeg, Manitoba. A visiting pastor celebrates Divine Liturgy.
- Saint Sdepanos Armenian Church of Windsor, Ontario. A visiting pastor celebrates Divine Liturgy.

== Prelates ==
*Archbishop Khajag Hagopian (May 2002 - 10 May 2014)

Sarkis Hagopian was born in Syria on June 20, 1946. At a young age, he and his family relocated to Lebanon, where he was educated at Torkomian School, and in 1961 entered the Seminary at the Catholicosate of the Holy See of Cilicia in Antelias. In 1965 he was ordained a deacon by Bishop Karekin Sarkisian, who later became the Catholicos of the Holy See of Cilicia and the Catholicos of All Armenians.

In 1968, Deacon Hagopian was ordained a celibate priest and in 1971 he received the title of Very Reverend -Vartabed.

Khajag Hagopian was elected the Locum Tenens of Jezireh, Northern Syria Prelacy. After serving in that capacity for eight years, he returned to Lebanon where he resumed his academic studies at the Middle East Theological institute. In 1981, at the invitation of Archbishop Mesrob Ashjian, the Prelate of Eastern US and Canada, Hagopian relocated to New York. where he served as special assistant to the Prelate.

In 1983, he became the first parish priest of the newly established St. Mary Church in Toronto. In 1985 he was ordained a Right Reverend by Archbishop Ashjian. In 1994, Hagopian was assigned to serve as the parish priest of the Holy Martyrs Armenian Church in Encino. He was ordained bishop in 1997 and was elected as Prelate of Canada in 2004.

*Bishop Meghrig Parikian (10 May 2014 - 16 February 2016)

In July 1994, he was given the title of Very Reverend – Vartabed, by Archbishop Ardag Manougian, after presenting his thesis on the Letters of His Holiness, Catholicos Nerses of all Armenians. The following year, in 1995, Father Parikian was appointed Sacristan at the Catholicosate. Aram I, Catholicos of the Armenian Catholicosate, bestowed Parikian with the right to wear a pectoral cross in January 1996.

Throughout the next couple of years, he attended the Ecumenical Institute at Bossey, where he followed the "Overcome Violence" educational program. As a deacon, Parikian had begun studying the piano under the direction of Setrag Setragian, and continued his piano studies during his service in Lebanon.

In 1997, he moved to New York to attend Mannes College, The New School for Music and was instructed by Peter Bellino until his departure in 1999.

Upon his return to Lebanon, he took on the duty of director of the Birds Nest Armenian Orphanage in Byblos until 2002. In May of that year he was given the title of Right Reverend by Bishop Zareh Aznavourian; on the same day, Aram I bestowed on him the right to wear the official purple cassock of the Armenian Catholicosate. Later that year, he was appointed as the parish priest for the St. Mary Armenian Apostolic Church in Toronto; he served the local Armenian community for 12 years.

In 2010, under the Auspices of Archbishop Khajag Hagopian, the former Prelate of the Armenian Prelacy of Canada, Meghrig Parikian Parikian was named as the Rector of the province of Ontario. Archbishop Khajag Hagopian, appointed Parikian as Vicar General on December 17, 2013.

On April 27, 2014, Aram I ordained Father Parikian as a bishop. He was elected Prelate of Canada on May 10, 2014.

*Archbishop Papken Tcharian (14 May 2016 – Present)

Archbishop Papken Tcharian (baptismal name Hagop) was born in Beirut, Lebanon, in 1965, and received his primary education at the Hayashen Torkomian National Elementary School in Beirut.

In 1976, he was admitted to the Seminary of the Catholicosate of Cilicia, and following his graduation from the clerical college, he was ordained as Deacon. Three years later, he completed his education in Theology and Armenian Studies, was ordained as a celibate priest by Archbishop Datev Sarkissian, and renamed Fr. Papken. Following his appointment, he worked as a teacher and superintendent at the Seminary. During those years he also taught at the Bird's Nest Orphanage and at the Hayashen Torkomian National Elementary School.

In 1989, he completed his thesis "The Great Loss of the Armenian Clergy during the Armenian Genocide," upon which Karekin II, Catholicos of the Armenian Catholicosate of Cilicia, ordained him as Very Reverend Father. During his tenure at the Seminary from 1986 to 1993, he also occupied the posts of Official Staff Bearer and Personal Secretary to Karekin II. During those years, he was also the Director of the Seminary's clerical courses and taught Armenian language, history and geography, and theology for seven years at the Apkarian National School. From 1993 to 1996, he became the first pastor to serve the Armenian communities in Sharjah, Dubai and Abu Dhabi of the United Arab Emirates, where he taught Armenian at the one-day Armenian schools.

In 1996, he was nominated to the clerical council of the Armenian Church University Student Association (ACUSA).

From 1996 to 2002, he served at the Western Prelacy of the Armenian Apostolic Church of America, as pastor of the St. Gregory Armenian Apostolic Church in San Francisco. During this time, he was also elected as Chairman of the Prelacy's Religious Council.

In 1998, Aram I, Catholicos of the Armenian Catholicosate of Cilicia, elevated him to the rank of Most Reverend Father. Following his service at the Western Prelacy of the United States, he moved to Syria, where he served the community of Qamishli as Vicar General from 2002 to 2004.

In August 2004, he was elected Prelate of the Prelacy of Isfahan in Iran and served the community for 12 years.

In June 2006, Aram I ordained him Bishop. In 2014, on the 30th anniversary of his ordination as priest and on the 10th anniversary of his election as Prelate, Aram I elevated Tcharian to Archbishop. On May 14, 2016, the CANAR elected Archbishop Tcharian Prelate of the Armenian Prelacy of Canada.

== See also ==
- Armenian Diocese of Beroea
