= Payaslian =

Payaslian (Armenian: Փայասլեան) may refer to:

- Simon Payaslian, Armenian academic
- Zareh I Payaslian (1915-1963), Armenian catholicos
