= Sahak II of Cilicia =

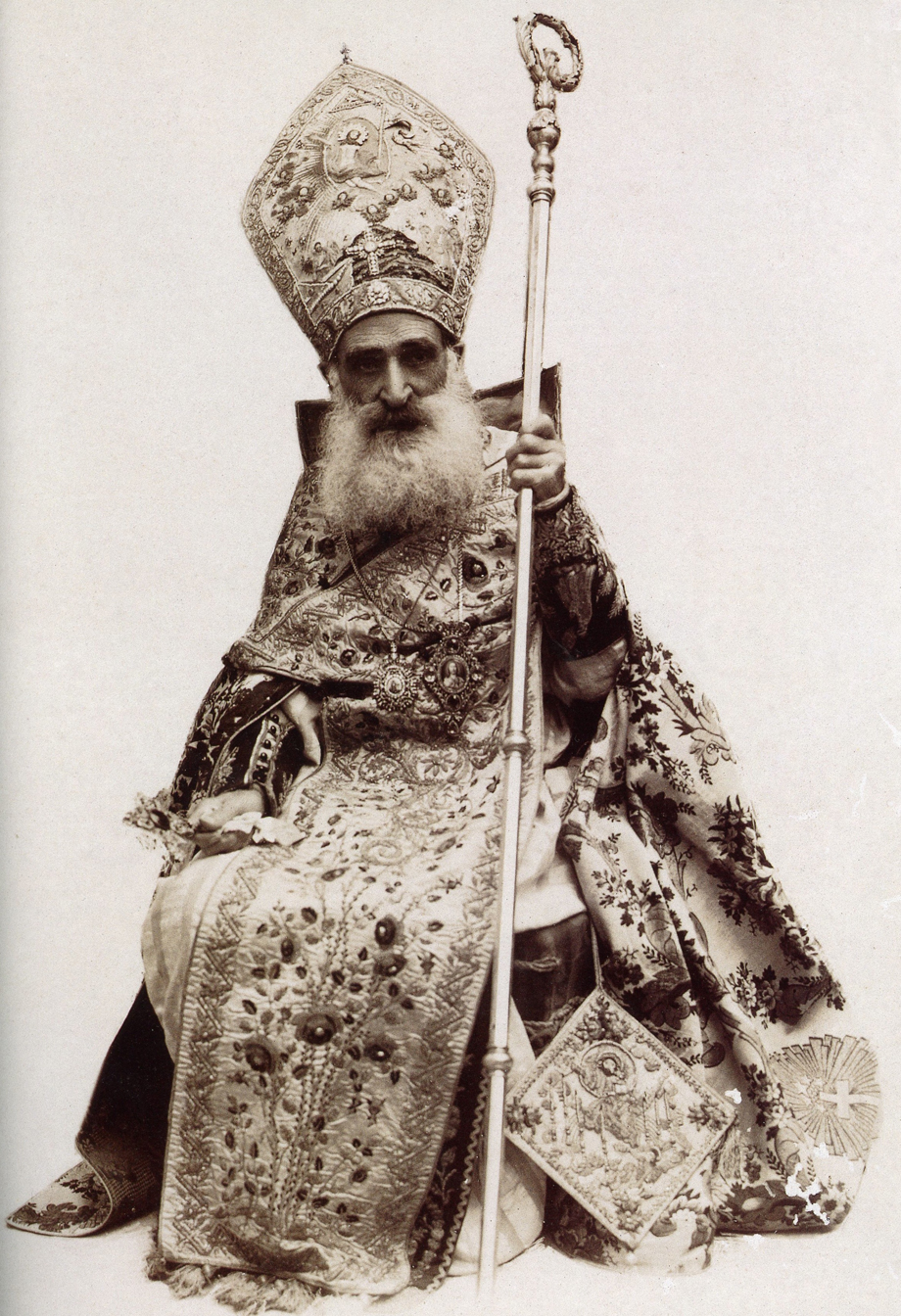
Catholicos Sahak II of Cilicia

Sahak II or Isaac II, last name Khabayan (Armenian: Սահակ Բ. Խապայեան (Եղեգցի)) (March 25, 1849 – October 8, 1939), was Catholicos of Cilicia of the Armenian Apostolic Church in 1902–1939.

Born in the village of Yeghiki in Kharpert, he received his religious training in Constantinople and Jerusalem. He was Catholicos of Cilicia during the tumultuous years of the Armenian genocide, and was first exiled from the see's seat in Sis, and then again after relocating to Adana. From 1921 the Catholicos wandered the Middle East from place to place with no permanent home.

By 1929, aged 80 and weary, Catholicos Sahak appealed for help to the Near East Relief organization, which had built several orphanages for orphaned Armenian children fleeing the genocide. One of these orphanages was in the town of Antelias near Beirut, Lebanon, which they leased to the Catholicos for one dollar a year. Sahak also sought to bring his dream for an Armenian theological seminary to life at this site, since all seminaries under his jurisdiction had been closed or fallen apart after the genocide.

Due to his advanced age, Sahak II encouraged the election of a co-adjutor Catholicos to share his throne. Papken I Guleserian reigned along with Sahak from 1931 until his death in 1936. Sahak II lived on another three years until his death at age 90.

Religious titles
Preceded by Megerdich I of Cilicia	Catholicos of the Holy See of Cilicia; 1902–1939	Succeeded by Bedros IV of Cilicia
