= Megerdich I of Cilicia =

Megerdich I (? – died 1894), (Armenian: Մկրտիչ Ա. Քեֆսիզեան (Մարաշցի) ) was Catholicos of Cilicia of the Holy See of Cilicia of the Armenian Apostolic Church from 1871 to 1894.

After his death, the position of catholicos remained vacant for 8 years (1894–1902), until the election of Sahag II of Cilicia.

Preceded by Giragos II of Cilicia	Catholicos of the Holy See of Cilicia; 1871–1894	Succeeded by Sahag II of Cilicia
