= Karekin I (Cilicia) =

Armenian art scholar and Catholicos of Cilicia (1943–1952)

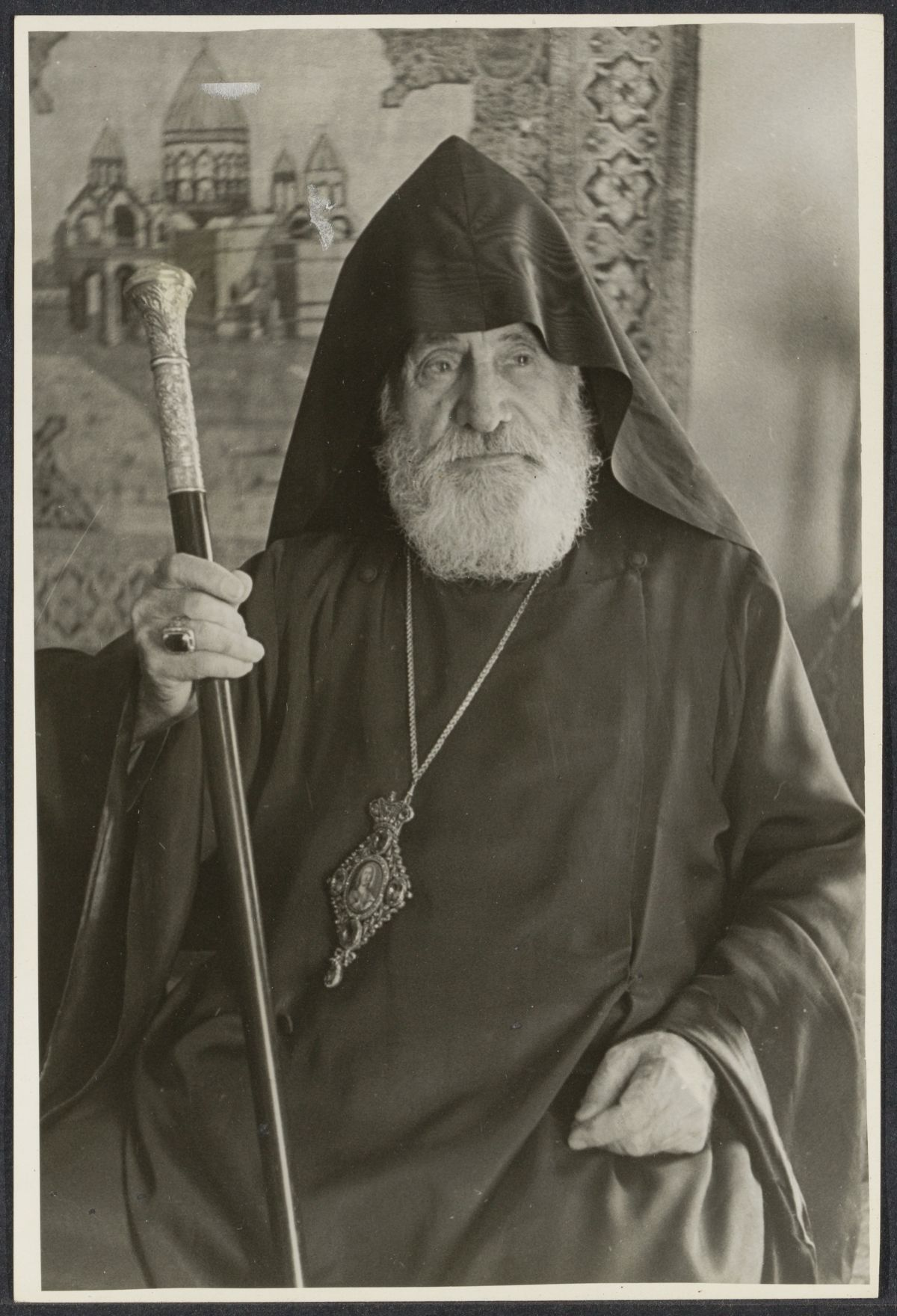
Garegin I of Cilicia

Karekin I (Armenian: Գարեգին Ա. Յովսէփեանց) (17 December 1867 in Khachisar (now Chardakhlu), Artsakh – 21 June 1952 in Antelias, Lebanon) was a scholar of Armenian art and Catholicos of Cilicia of the Armenian Apostolic Church from 1943 to 1952.

== Education and career as clergyman ==
Born Garegin Hovsepian and originally from Artsakh (then part of the Elizavetpol Governorate of the Russian Empire), he studied at the Gevorgian Seminary of the Catholicosate of All Armenians in Etchmiadzin (1882-1890). During this period, he was ordained a deacon of the Armenian Church and joined the Congregation of the Holy See of Etchmiadzin. In 1892-1897, he studied theology and philosophy at the universities of Leipzig, Halle and Berlin. His doctoral dissertation was published in Leipzig in 1897.

After his return from Germany, Karekin was ordained a celibate priest in Etchmiadzin. In 1917 he was ordained bishop, Until the outbreak of the First World War, he held a number of teaching and administrative positions within the jurisdiction of the Holy See, in Etchmiadzin, Yerevan, and Tbilisi; he was, at different times, head of the Echdmiazin library, Dean of the Gevorgian Seminary, and editor of the Catholicosate's journal, Ararat. Following the mass influx of refugees, escaping the Armenian genocide in the Ottoman Empire in 1915-1916, he chaired the Commission of Brotherly Assistance, which looked after the fleeing orphans.

Karekin was ordained a bishop in 1917, In May 1918, during the Ottoman invasion of Transcaucasia, he participated in the Battle of Sardarapat; he and fellow priests visited villages close to the battle-front to encourage both the Armenian soldiers and unarmed villagers to resist the invading army. His service was appreciated through subsequent decorations he received from both the Russian Commander of the Caucasian Front and the government of the Republic of Armenia (1918-1920). It also accorded him tremendous respect in Armenian nationalist circles, including the influential Armenian Revolutionary Federation Party. This proved crucial during pivotal moments in his subsequent career.

In 1920, during the invasion of Armenia by the Turkish Kemalist troops, Karekin again volunteered to be at the frontline. This time, however, he fell captive when the Kemalists captured Kars on 30 October. He escaped on 19 January 1921, sought refuge in the city's American orphanage, and, on 21 March, he finally reached Armenian territory, where Soviet rule had already been established.

Karekin witnessed from close range Soviet attempts to destroy organized religion, including the Armenian Church. As early as 1923, the Soviet secret police reported its unhappiness with his religious activities. In 1924, he toured other Armenian communities in the USSR and raised 120,000 roubles for Etchmiadzin. In 1924, he was appointed to the newly established Supreme Spiritual Council of Etchmiadzin and was later re-elected to serve on that body in both 1932 and 1941. In 1925, he was elevated to the rank of archbishop. He played a key role in collecting relief for the victims of the strong earthquake that hit Armenia's second largest city, Leninakan (now, Gyumri) in 1926. From 1927 to 1933, Karekin was the primate of the Diocese of Crimea and Nor Nakhichevan (a suburb of Rostov-on-Don), which covered Armenian Church parishes and institutions over vast stretches of Russian territory, including Moscow and Leningrad. He could do very little, however, to stop the continued closing of Armenian churches in those areas.

In 1934 Catholicos Khoren I of Etchmiadzin appointed Karekin pontifical legate to travel abroad in order to raise funds for the reconstruction of the Etchmiadzin Cathedral and other expenses of the Catholicosate, as well solve administrative problems that had arisen in some dioceses of the Armenian Church outside the USSR, particularly in France and the USA. From 1935 Karekin visited nearly a dozen European and Middle Eastern countries, during which he raised some US$35,000.

In 1936 Karekin reached the US in what proved to be the final leg of his mission. A serious schism had arisen in the Armenian Church in North America on the issue of cooperation with the Holy See of Etchmiadzin, which the dissidents complained was fully under Communist control in Soviet Armenia. Karekin failed to find a solution to this crisis. The Armenian Church Diocese, which had stayed loyal to Etchmiadzin, eventually elected him as its next primate. His election came despite repeated calls from Etchmiadzin for his return to the Holy See. Indeed, the locum tenens, Archbishop Gevorg Chorekchian, reported to the National Ecclesiastical Assembly (NEA) in Etchmiadzin in 1941 that the results of Karekin's mission abroad had not covered the financial needs of the Holy See.

In 1938-1943 Karekin served as primate of the Eastern Diocese of the Armenian Church in North America. After the USSR and the USA became allies during World War II, he led efforts to collect $120,000 from Armenian-Americans to assist Armenian soldiers in the Red Army and Armenian civilians harmed by the ongoing war in Europe. Separately, he also helped raise another $85,000 for the formation of the David of Sasun Tank Unit for the Red Army.

Karekin's religious career took an unexpected turn in 1943, when the competing pro- and anti-Soviet Armenian political factions agreed on his candidacy as the next Catholicos of the Great House of Cilicia, the second most important see of the Armenian Church. Wartime conditions made it impossible for Karekin to leave the US and reach the seat of this catholicosate in Lebanon until March 1945. In the meantime, he stayed in New York, raising $44,000 for the Catholicosate of Cilicia, plus receiving commitments to sponsor students in its seminary.

In June 1945, Karekin briefly returned to Soviet Armenia (for the first time since 1934) to participate in the NEA, which elected Chorekchian as the next Catholicos of All Armenians. Karekin was the first Catholicos of Cilicia to participate in the election of the Catholicos of Etchmiadzin, and he personally consecrated the newly elected Gevorg VI. In 1946-1949, Karekin supported the Kremlin-backed campaign of repatriation of around 90,000 diasporan Armenians to Soviet Armenia. In 1946, Gevorg accorded him the unprecedented privilege of carrying a diamond cross on his hood, usually the sole prerogative of the Catholicos of All Armenians. Gevorg also asked Karekin to mediate a solution to an administrative dispute within the Armenian Patriarchate in Istanbul, which is traditionally outside the jurisdiction of the Catholicosate of Cilicia.

Cold War pressures sharpened intra-Armenian political disputes in the Middle East in the last years of Karekin's reign. His relations with the anti-Soviet Dashnak party, which had supported his election, now cooled. After Karekin's health began to deteriorate from 1950, Soviet leaders in Moscow feared that a pro-Dashnak clergyman might end up being his successor. In 1951, they pushed Gevorg in Etchmiadzin to formally write to Karekin in Lebanon and suggest appointing and ordaining a successor (acceptable to the Soviets) during his own lifetime. Karekin refused this offer, seeing in it a violation of the internal freedoms traditionally enjoyed by the catholicosates of both Etchmiadzin and Cilicia. Indeed, Karekin's death in 1952 was followed by a four-year struggle over his succession, ending in a victory for the Dashnak-supported candidate.

== Career as a scholar ==
Karekin is also remembered as a prominent scholar of Armenian Art at the end of the nineteenth and first half of the twentieth century.

Initially, his scholarly interest focused on collecting and studying Armenian oral literature. He also produced some works on theology. Thereafter, he developed strong interests in the study of medieval Armenian manuscripts (especially their illuminations, colophons and paleography), as well as medieval literature, historiography, archaeology, architecture, epigraphy, and plastic arts. He authored a number of monographs and dozens of scholarly articles, mostly in Armenian, but also a few in Russian.

During the tsarist period, he was elected a member of the Caucasian branch of the Imperial Archeological Society in Moscow, and the Russian Imperial Archeological Society at St Petersburg. In the aftermath of the Armenian Genocide, he embarked upon establishing an Armenian ethnographic museum in Transcaucasia in 1917, collecting materials from refugees fleeing the Ottoman Empire.

During the brief period of Armenian independence (1918-1920), he was appointed professor of Armenian Art History and Archeology at the newly established Yerevan State University. He also became a founder-member of the Committee for the Preservation of the Monuments of Armenia.

Karekin continued his scholarly activities within state-supported academic and research institutions in the earliest years of Soviet rule, but the Communist regime's aggressive anti-religious campaign soon made it impossible for him to publish in Soviet academic journals. From the late 1920s, his studies appeared in various publications of the Armenian Diaspora. However, the Soviet Armenian Academy of Sciences posthumously published a two-volume anthology of his works, in 1983-1987.

During his reign as Catholicos of Cilicia, Karekin also took tangible steps towards turning the Catholicosate's headquarters in Lebanon into an Armenian cultural center in the diaspora. In 1951, he published Hishatakarank Dzeragrats (in Armenian Յիշատակարանք Ձեռագրաց), a 1,255 page book about religious and historical references spanning from the 5th century to 1250 A.D. The information was gathered from ancient Armenian manuscripts that were located, among other places, at the Armenian Patriarchate in Jerusalem. He was assisted in this project by his Staff-Bearer (gavazanakir), seminary student Torkom Postajian, who traveled to Jerusalem with him and hand-copied and compiled the information from the original documents.

== Notes ==
Shortly after the death of Karekin I in 1952, Neshan Sarkissian, an Armenian cleric, was ordained a priest taking the name Karekin in remembrance of the late Catholicos. Karekin Sarkissian later became Catholicos Karekin II of Cilicia and then Catholicos Karekin I of All Armenians.

== Secondary sources ==
- Arzumanean, Rev. Zawen, Azgapatum [The Story of the Nation], Vol. 4, Books I-II (New York, 1995 and 1997).
- Avakian, Arra S. (1998). Armenia: A Journey Through History. The Electric Press, Fresno.
- Eghiayean, Biwzand (1975). Zhamanakakits Patmutiwn Katoghikosutean Hayots Kilikioy 1914-1972 [Contemporary History of the Armenian Catholicossate of Cilicia]. Antelias, pp. 565–628.
- Oshakan, Hakob (1948). Arewelahay banasirutiwne ew Ejmiatsin: Garegin Katoghikos Hovsepian [Eastern Armenian Philology and Echmiadzin: Catholicos Karekin Hovsepian]. Antelias.

Preceded by Bedros IV of Cilicia	Catholicos of the Holy See of Cilicia; 1943–1952	Succeeded by Zareh I
