= Bedros I of Cilicia =

Catholicos of Cicilia of the Armenian Apostolic Church

Bedros I Sarajian (Armenian: Պետրոս Ա. Սարաճյան ) (1870 – 28 September 1940, Beirut) was Catholicos of Cilicia of the Armenian Apostolic Church for six months in 1940. After his death, the position remained vacant until 1943 when Karekin I of Cilicia was elected.

Bedros was Armenian Prelate of Cyprus (1899–1905 and 1920–1940) and Armenian Prelate of Hadjin (1910–1915). Following the death of Co-Adjutor Papken Gyuluserian in July 1936, the 87-year-old Catholicos Sahak named Bedros Co-Adjutor Catholicos of Cilicia (1936–1940). He was eventually elected as Catholicos on 30 May 1940 and consecrated in the newly built St Gregory the Illuminator Cathedral in Antelias on 2 July.

Preceded by Sahag II of Cilicia	Catholicos of the Holy See of Cilicia; 1940	Succeeded by Karekin I

Source: Avakian, Arra S. (1998). Armenia: A Journey Through History. The Electric Press, Fresno.
