= Babken I of Cilicia =

Catholicos Coadjutor (1868–1936)

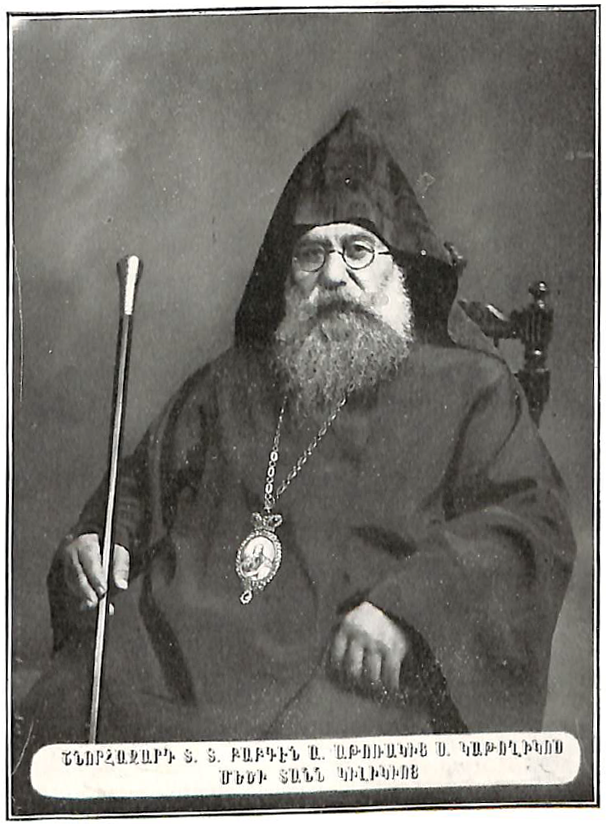
Babken I of Cilicia

Babken I of Cilicia (Armenian: Բաբգեն Ա.; 23 March 1868 in Aintab – 9 July 1936 in Antelias) was Catholicos Coadjutor to Sahag II, Catholicos of Cilicia of the Holy See of Cilicia of the Armenian Apostolic Church. He was chosen because of the old age of the Catholicos to assist him in his duties.

Born Harutyun Gulesserian, Babken I served as Coadjutor for the period 1931 to 1936, whereas Catholicos Sahag II served from 1902 to 1939, outliving him.
