= Aram I =

Clergyman of the Armenian Apostolic Church

His Holiness Catholicos Aram I
- Catholicos of Cilicia
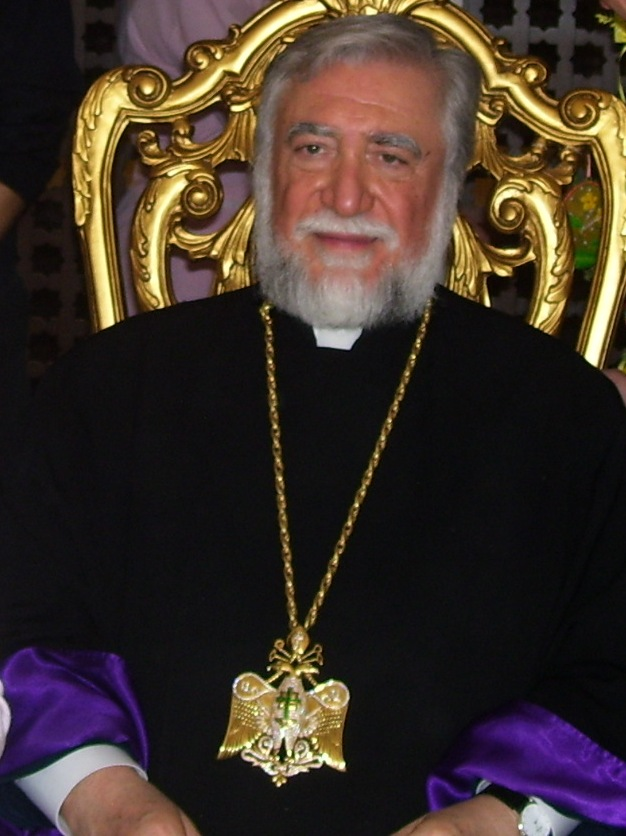
- Church: Armenian Apostolic Church
- See: Holy See of Cilicia
- Appointed: 1995
- Predecessor: Karekin II (later Karekin I, Catholicos of All Armenians)

Personal details
- Born: Bedros Keshishian; 8 March 1947 (age 79) Beirut, Lebanon
- Denomination: Armenian Apostolic

Aram I (Armenian: Արամ Ա; born Bedros Keshishian [Պետրոս Քեշիշեան] on 8 March 1947) has been the head of the Catholicosate of Cilicia in the Armenian Apostolic Church since 1995. He resides in Antelias, Lebanon.

== Bibliography ==
Aram I has written the following books:

- Nerses the Gracious: Theologian and Ecumenist, 1974, Beirut (in Armenian)
- The Witness of the Armenian Church in a Diaspora Situation, 1977, New York (in English), two editions
- The True Image of the Armenian Church, 1979, Antelias (in Armenian)
- With the Will of Re-Building, 1984, Beirut (in Armenian)
- With the People, 1989, Beirut (in Armenian)
- Conciliar Fellowship: a Common Goal, 1989, Geneva (in English), two editions
- Orthodox Perspectives on Mission, 1992, Oxford (in English), two editions
- Towards the 1700th Anniversary of the Christianization of Armenia, 1994, Antelias (in Armenian)
- The Challenge to be a Church in a Changing World, 1997, New York (in English), two editions
- Jesus Christ: the Son of God-the Son of Man, 1999, Antelias (in Armenian), two editions
- Church, Nation and Homeland, 1999, Antelias (in Armenian), two editions
- In Search of Ecumenical Vision, 2000, Antelias (in English), three editions
- L'eglise Face aux Grands défis, 2000, Antelias (in French), two editions
- The Armenian Church Beyond the 1700th Anniversary, 2002, Antelias (in English), three editions
- The Mission of Faith, 2003, Antelias (in Armenian), two editions
- Justice, Paix, Réconciliation, 2003, Antelias (in French)
- The Christian Witness at the Crossroads in the Middle East, 2004, Antelias (in English), three editions
- Der Zor: A National Sanctuary, 2005, Antelias (in Armenian)
- The Dignity of Serving, 2005, Antelias (in Armenian)
- For a Church Beyond its Walls, 2006, Antelias (in English)
- Pour un Monde Transformé, 2006, Antelias (in French)
- Dialogue with Youth Montreal, 2009 (in English and French)
- Enriching Life with values, Antelias, 2009 (in Armenian)
- St. Nerses the Gracious and Church Unity, Antelias, 2010 (in English)
- A Journey of Faith, Hope and Vision, Antelias, 2011 (in English)
- Taking the Church to the People, Antelias, 2011 (in English)
- Issues and Perspectives, Antelias, 2013 (in English)
- The Armenian Church. Author: His Holiness Aram I - Antelias, 2016, English, 241 Pages.
- L'Église Arménienne. Author: His Holiness Aram I - Antelias, 2018, French, 257 Pages.
- «Against New Horizons» Author: His Holiness Aram I - Antelias, 2018, 581 Pages
- Армянская Церковь (Armenian Church), Author: His Holiness Aram I - Antelias, 2018, Russian, 253 Pages.

== Inter-religious dialogue ==
In 2000, he indicated that he had no problem with the substance of Dominus Iesus, the document on relativism of the Holy Office of the Catholic Church, but faulted it for its unecumenical language.

On 18 May 2026, he visited Pope Leo XIV in the Vatican, and suggested a new ecumenical council ("Vatican III").

== Awards ==
Baselios MarThoma Didymos I, the Catholicos of the East and Malankara Metropolitan (Primate of the Malankara Orthodox Church), conferred the Order of St. Thomas, the most prestigious honor of the Church, on Aram I on February 27, 2010, at Kolenchery, India.

Preceded by Karekin II	Catholicos of the Holy See of Cilicia; 1994–present	Incumbent
