= List of Armenian catholicoi of Cilicia =

This is a list of the Armenian catholicoi of Cilicia of the Holy See of Cilicia (full name: the Armenian Catholicosate of the Great House of Cilicia, Armenian: Կաթողիկոսութիւն Հայոց Մեծի Տանն Կիլիկիոյ). The Armenian patriarchate was transferred from Armenia to Cilicia in 1058. Although the see at Echmiadzin was restored in 1441, the Cilician catholicosate continued in existence, and continues to exist to the present day. Today the see is located in Antelias, Lebanon. The Catholicos of Armenia and All Armenians claims sovereignty over the Catholicos of Cilicia, though the latter operates independently.

== Catholicoi of Cilicia ==
(Name in English, dates, Armenian name)

The Catholicoi of the Great House of Cilicia (the traditional name of the Holy See) include:

=== Sivas era (1058–1062), Tavbloor era (1062–1066) ===
- Khachik II of Armenia, Khachik II of Ani, Khachik II of Cilicia (1058–1065) -- Խաչիկ Բ. Անեցի

=== Dzamendav (Zamidia) era (1066–1116) ===
- Gregory II the Martyrophile (1066–1105) -- Գրիգոր Բ. Վկայասէր
- Parsegh of Cilicia (1105–1113) -- Բարսեղ Ա. Անեցի

=== Dzovk era (1116–1150), Hromgla era (1150–1293) ===
- Gregory III of Cilicia (1113–1166) -- Գրիգոր Գ. Պահլաւունի
- St. Nerses IV the Graceful (1166–1173) -- Սբ. Ներսէս Դ. Կլայեցի (Շնորհալի)
- Gregory IV the Young (1173–1193) -- Գրիգոր Դ. Տղայ
- Gregory V of Cilicia (1193–1194) -- Գրիգոր Ե. Քարավէժ
- Gregory VI of Cilicia (1194–1203) -- Գրիգոր Զ. Ապիրատ proclaimed communion with Rome.
- Barsegh II Anetsi (1195–1206) (rival catholicosate in historical Armenia set up after schism in the Armenian Church)
- John VI the Affluent (1203–1221) -- Յովհաննէս Զ. Սսեցի
- David III of Arkʻakałin (1207–1212) (catholicosate in Arkʻakałin due to Leo I decision) -- Դաւիթ Գ. Արքակաղնինեցի
- Constantine I of Cilicia (1221–1267) -- Կոնստանդին Ա. Բարձրբերդցի
- Jacob I the Learned (1268–1286) -- Յակոբ Ա. Կլայեցի
- Constantine II the Woolmaker (1286–1289) -- Կոնստանդին Բ. Կատուկեցի
- Stephen IV of Cilicia (1290–1293) -- Ստեփանոս Դ. Հռոմկլայեցի

=== Sis era (1293–1902) ===
- Gregory VII of Cilicia (1293–1307) -- Գրիգոր Է. Անաւարզեցի
  - Constantine II the Woolmaker (restored) (1307–1322) -- Կոնստանդին Բ. Կատուկեցի
- Constantine III of Cilicia (1323–1326) -- Կոնստանդին Դ. Լամբրոնացի
- Jacob II of Cilicia (1327–1341), d. 1359—Յակոբ Բ. Անաւարզեցի
- Mekhitar I of Cilicia (1341–1355) -- Մխիթար Ա. Գռներցի
  - Jacob II of Cilicia (restored) (1355–1359) -- Յակոբ Բ. Անաւարզեցի
- Mesrop I of Cilicia (1359–1372) -- Մեսրոպ Ա. Արտազեցի
- Constantine IV of Cilicia (1372–1374) -- Կոնստանդին Ե. Սսեցի
- Paul I of Cilicia (1374–1382) -- Պօղոս Ա. Սսեցի
- Theodore II of Cilicia (1382–1392) -- Թէոդորոս Բ. Կիլիկեցի
- Karapet of Cilicia (1393–1404) -- Կարապետ Ա. Կեղեցի
- Jacob III of Cilicia (1404–1411) -- Յակոբ Գ. Սսեցի
- Gregory VIII of Cilicia (1411–1418) -- Գրիգոր Ը. Խանձողատ
- Paul II of Cilicia (1418–1430) -- Պօղոս Բ. Գառնեցի
- Constantine V of Cilicia (1430–1439) -- Կոնստանդին Զ. Վահկացի
- Gregory IX of Cilicia (1439–1446) -- Գրիգոր Թ. Ջալալբեկեանց

During Gregory IX's reign, the Mother See of Holy Echmiadzin was restored, 1441.

For a separate list of Catholicoi at the Mother See of Holy Echmiadzin, see List of catholicoi of all Armenians.

- Karapet II of Cilicia (1446–1477) -- Կարապետ Ա. Եւդոկացի
- Stepanos I of Cilicia (1475–1483) -- Ստեփանոս Ա. Սարաձորցի
- Hovhannes I of Cilicia (1483–1488) -- Յովհաննէս Ա. Անտիոքցի
- Hovhannes II of Cilicia (1489–1525) -- Յովհաննէս Բ. Թլկուրանցի
- Hovhannes III of Cilicia (1525–1539) -- Յովհաննէս Գ. Քիլիսցի (Կայծակն, Կայծառ)
- Simeon I of Cilicia (1539–1545) -- Սիմէոն Ա. Զէյթունցի
- Ghazar I (1545–1547) -- Ղազար Ա. Զէյթունցի
- Toros I of Cilicia (1548–1553) -- Թորոս Ա. Սսեցի
- Khachatour I of Cilicia (1553–1558) -- Խաչատուր Ա. Չորիկ
- Khachatour II of Cilicia (1560–1584) -- Խաչատուր Բ. Զէյթունցի (Խաչիկ Ուլնեցի, Երաժիշտ)
- Azaria I of Cilicia (1584–1601) -- Ազարիա Ա. Ջուղայեցի
- Hovhannes IV of Cilicia (1601–1621) -- Յովհաննէս Դ. Այնթափցի
  - Petros I of Cilicia (coadjutor) (1601–1608) -- Պետրոս Ա.
- Minas of Cilicia (1621–1632) -- Մինաս Ա. Սսեցի (Կարնեցի, Թացախ)
- Simeon II of Cilicia (1633–1648) -- Սիմէոն Բ. Սեբաստացի
- Nerses I of Cilicia—Ներսէս Ա. Սեբաստացի
- Toros II of Cilicia (1654–1657) -- Թորոս Բ. Սեբաստացի
- Khachatour III of Cilicia (1657–1677) -- Խաչատուր Գ. Գաղատացի (Մինտերճի, Մինտերճեան)
- Sahak I of Cilicia (1677–1683) -- Սահակ Ա. Քիլիսցի (Մէյխանեճի, Մէյխանեճեան)
- Azaria II of Cilicia (1683–1686) -- Ազարիա Բ.
- Grigor II of Cilicia (1686–1695) -- Գրիգոր Բ. Ատանացի (Պիծակն)
- Astvatsatour (1695–1703) -- Աստուածատուր Ա. Սասունցի (Նարին)
- Madteos (1703–1705) -- Մատթէոս Ա. Կեսարացի (Սարի)
- Hovhannes V (1705–1721) -- Յովհաննէս Ե. Հաճընցի
- Grigor III (1721/2–1729) -- Գրիգոր Գ. Կեսարացի (Ուղուրլու, Ուղուրլեան)
- Hovhannes VI (1729/30–1731) -- Յովհաննէս Զ. Հաճընցի (Տէր Ադամ)
- Ghougas I of Cilicia (1731–1737) -- Ղուկաս Ա. Աջապահեան (Աջապահ, Աջապան, Սսեցի)
- Michael I of Cilicia (1737–1758) -- Միքայէլ Ա. Աջապահեան (Սսեցի)
- Gabriel of Cilicia (1758–1770) -- Գաբրիէլ Ա. Աջապահեան (Սսեցի)
- Yeprem I of Cilicia (1770–1784) -- Եփրեմ Ա. Աջապահեան (Սսեցի)
- Toros III of Cilicia (1784–1796) -- Թէոդորոս Գ. Աջապահեան (Սսեցի) (Թորոս Գ. Սսեցի)
- Kirakos I of Cilicia (1797–1822) -- Կիրակոս Ա. Աջապահեան (Սսեցի, Մեծն, Մեծագործ)
- Yeprem II of Cilicia (1822–1833) -- Եփրեմ Բ. Աջապահեան (Սսեցի, Տեր-Մանուէլեան)
- Michael II of Cilicia (1833–1855) -- Միքայէլ Բ. Աջապահեան (Սսեցի, Ղուկասեան)
- Kirakos II of Cilicia (1855–1866) -- Կիրակոս Բ. Աջապահեան (Սսեցի)
- Megerdich I of Cilicia (1871–1894) -- Մկրտիչ Ա. Քեֆսիզեան (Մարաշցի)
  - vacant (1894–1902)

=== Sis (1902–1921), Aleppo (1921–1930), and Antelias (Lebanon) era (1930–present) ===
Portrait	Name of Patriarch		Dates	Notes
Portrait	English	Armenian	Dates	Notes
	Sahak II	Սահակ Բ. Խապայեան (Եղեգցի)	(1902–1939)	
	Babken I	Բաբգէն Ա.	(1931–1936)	Catholicos Coadjutor
	Bedros I	Պետրոս Ա. Սարաճեան	(1940)	Served for six months
Seat vacant (1940–1943)
	Karekin I	Գարեգին Ա. Յովսէփեան	(1943–1952)	
Seat vacant (1952–1956)
	Zareh I	Զարեհ Ա. Փայասլեան	(1956–1963)	
	Khoren I	Խորէն Ա. Բարոյեան	(1963–1983)	
	Karekin II	Գարեգին Բ. Սարգիսեան	(1977–1983)	Catholicos Coadjutor
	Karekin II	Գարեգին Բ. Սարգիսեան	(1983–1994)	Catholicos after having served as Coadjutor to Khoren I for 6 years. Upon death of Vazgen I, Catholicos Karekin II was elected Catholicos of All Armenians and became known as Karekin I from 1994 to 1999
	Aram I	Արամ Ա. Քեշիշեան	(1995–present)	

== See also ==
- Catholicos of All Armenians
  - List of catholicoi of all Armenians
- List of Armenian patriarchs of Jerusalem
- List of Armenian patriarchs of Constantinople
- List of Armenian Catholic patriarchs of Cilicia
