= Zareh I =

Religious figure

Zareh I Payaslian (Armenian: Զարեհ Ա. Փայասլեան) (14 February 1915, Marash – 18 February 1963, Beirut, Lebanon) was Catholicos of Cilicia of the Armenian Apostolic Church from 1956 to 1963.

== Life ==
Zareh I was born in 1915, in Marash, Ottoman Empire as Simon Payaslian. Escaping the Armenian genocide, his family moved to Syria, residing in the city of Hama, then in Aleppo. He received his primary education in Mesrobian and Haygazian schools in Aleppo. He received his secondary education in the Jesuit Seminary in Aleppo. Later, he became a graduate of the Antelias Seminary of the Armenian Catholicosate of the Great House of Cilicia. In 1935, he was ordained as a priest and took the name Zareh. He continued his higher education in Belgium between 1937–1940. From 1940, he served in the Armenian prelacy of Aleppo. He became Primate of Aleppo, Syria in 1943 until 1956. In 1946, he founded the Karen Jeppe Armenian College of Aleppo.

On 20 February 1956, Zareh Payaslian was elected as Catholicos of the Holy See of Cilicia, during very acrimonious times between various Armenian political factions that had left the position vacant for around 4 years since the death of Catholicos Karekin I in 1952. He was anointed catholicos at the cathedral in Antelias on 2 September 1956 by two Armenian bishops and a Syrian Orthodox bishop. After his election, Zareh I tried to restore some harmony between various Armenian factions, particularly after the inter-Armenian strife in Lebanon in 1958.

During his reign, the Catholicosate became a full member of the World Council of Churches in 1962, and sent observers to the Second Vatican Council.

Zareh died in 1963 at the age of 48.

== Legacy ==
On 2 April 1946, Zareh Payaslian was awarded the Syrian Order of Merit of the First Degree by the Syrian government, for his national patriotic role against the French mandate over Syria.

A street in Aleppo is named after the Catholicos Zareh I. His statue was erected in the Karen Jeppe College yard.

He wrote a number of studies about John the Golden Mouthed.

| Preceded by Karekin I (Cilicia) | Catholicos of the Holy See of Cilicia; 1956–1963 | Succeeded by Khoren I |
