= St. Mary Armenian Apostolic Church =

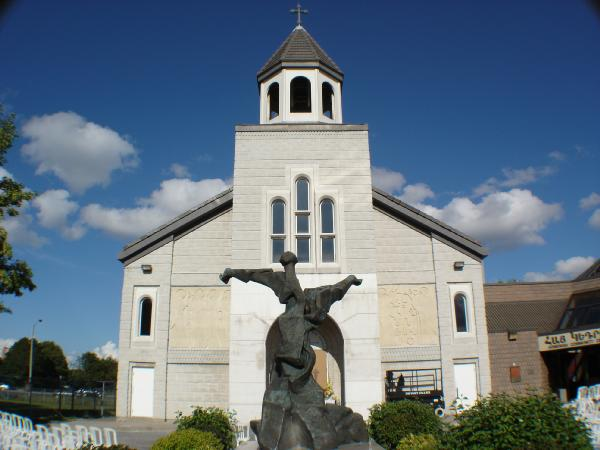
- St. Mary Armenian Apostolic Church
- St. Mary Armenian Apostolic Church
- 43.77097°N 79.323022°W
- Location: Toronto, Ontario
- Country: Canada
- Denomination: Armenian Apostolic Church
- Website: stmarytoronto.ca

History
- Founded: February 28, 1983

Clergy
- Pastor(s): Karekin Shekherdemian, Archpriest Datev Mikaelian

Established in 1983, St. Mary Armenian Apostolic Church is a church in Toronto, Ontario, Canada in the district of North York. It belongs to the Holy See of Cilicia.

== History ==
Toronto's Armenian Community Centre and A.R.S. Day School were opened in 1979. The Holy See of the Catholicosate of Cilicia had no Armenian Church; after a petition in 1983, approval to found a new church was given by the Prelacy of Canada and Eastern United States.

Archimandrite Khajag Hagopian became the church's first pastor when it was established in 1983. Services were conducted at St. Augustine Anglican Church located on Bayview Ave. in Toronto until a new church was built.

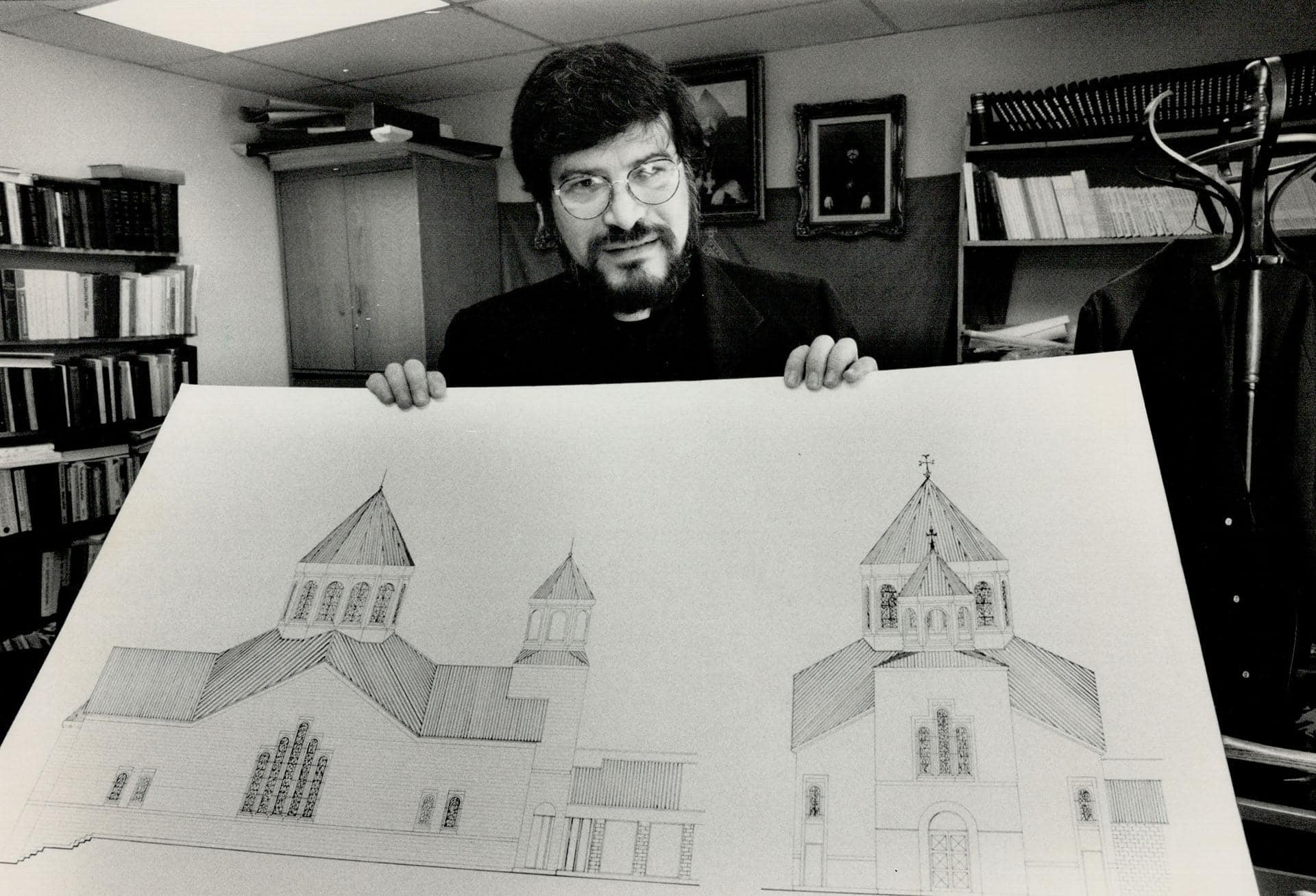
Very Reverend Khajag Hagopian holding a drawing of St. Mary Armenian Apostolic Church

On August 16, 1987 the foundation was laid for the new church building; on May 27, 1990, the new building was consecrated and its first Holy Mass was celebrated. The Church was officially named St. Mary Armenian Apostolic Church.

In the spring of 2012 the church was renovated under the auspices of the Prelate of Canada, Archbishop Khajag Hagopian.

In September 2025, a new HVAC system was installed.

In early 2026 the roof was replaced and is scheduled to finish in April 2026.

=== Pastors ===
As of 2024 St. Mary Armenian Apostolic Church has had ten parish priests:

Khajag Hagopian

(April 10, 1983 - December 9, 1994)

Sarkis Hagopian was born in Syria on June 20, 1946. In 1968 he was ordained a celibate priest, being renamed Khajag. In 1981 Hagopian moved to New York; in 1983 he became the first parish priest of the newly established St. Mary Armenian Apostolic Church in Toronto. After his term at St Mary's he became a bishop in 1997, and later an archbishop and Prelate of the Armenian Prelacy of Canada.

Shahe Panossian

(December 9, 1994 - December 19, 2002)

Kevork Panossian was born May 6, 1958, in Kessab, Syria. He was ordained a celibate priest on February 17, 1980, and given the name Shahe. After being pastor of the Armenian All Saints Apostolic Church in Glenview, Illinois, US from 1989, he became pastor of the Armenian Saint Mary Apostolic Church from 1994 to 2002. He then moved to Lebanon, ultimately becoming primate there.

Meghrig Parikian

(December 19, 2002 - May 10, 2014)

Stepanos Pashayan

(November 3, 2014 – January 7, 2016)

Kevork Pashayan was born in Beirut, Lebanon on April 13, 1981. In 1993, he was admitted to the Great House of Cilicia Seminary. In 1998, Archbishop Yeprem Tabakian ordained Kevork a sub-deacon. He was ordained a deacon in 2000, a celibate priest with name Father Stepanos in 2004 and a "Doctor of the Church" - Vartabed in 2009. On November 3, 2014, Pashayan began serving as the parish priest at St. Mary's Armenian Apostolic Church in Toronto, in the Armenian Prelacy of Canada, until appointed to serve as dean of St. Gregory the Illuminator Armenian Apostolic Church in Caracas, Venezuela on January 7, 2016.

Keghart Kosbakian

(April 1, 2016 - June 30, 2019)

Gomidas Panossian

(August 2012 - December 31, 2018)

Vartan Tashjian

(July 1, 2019-September 1, 2024)

Datev Mikaelian

(From September 1, 2019)

Karekin Shekherdemian

(From December 1, 2024)
