= Simon Payaslian =

Armenian-American historian

- Relatives: Zareh I (uncle)

Academic background
- Education: Wayne State University; University of California Los Angeles
- Thesis: United States Policy toward the Armenian Question and the Armenian Genocide (2003)
- Doctoral advisor: Richard Hovannisian

Simon Payaslian is an Armenian-American historian, author, editor, who has held the Charles K. and Elizabeth M. Kenosian Chair in Modern Armenian History and Literature at Boston University since 2007. From 2002 to 2007, he held the Kaloosdian/Mugar Chair in Armenian genocide Studies and Modern Armenian History at Clark University.

Payaslian is the nephew of Catholicos Zareh I. His first doctoral degree was earned in Political Science from Wayne State University, after which he went on to earn a second doctoral degree in Armenian history at the University of California Los Angeles under Richard Hovannisian, where his dissertation was titled United States Policy toward the Armenian Question and the Armenian Genocide.

== Works ==
- U.S. Foreign Economic and Military Aid: The Reagan and Bush Administrations (1996).
- International Political Economy: Conflict and Cooperation in the Global System (co-authored with Frederic S. Pearson) (1999; Chinese translation, Peking University Press, 2006)
- The Armenian Genocide, 1915–1923: A Handbook for Students and Teachers (2001)
- United States Policy toward the Armenian Question and the Armenian Genocide (2005)
- The History of Armenia: From the Origins to the Present (2007)
- He has co-edited (with Richard G. Hovannisian) two volumes, Armenian Constantinople (2010) and Armenian Cilicia (2008).
