= Armenian Prelacy of Isfahan =

Holy See of Cilicia

orthodox
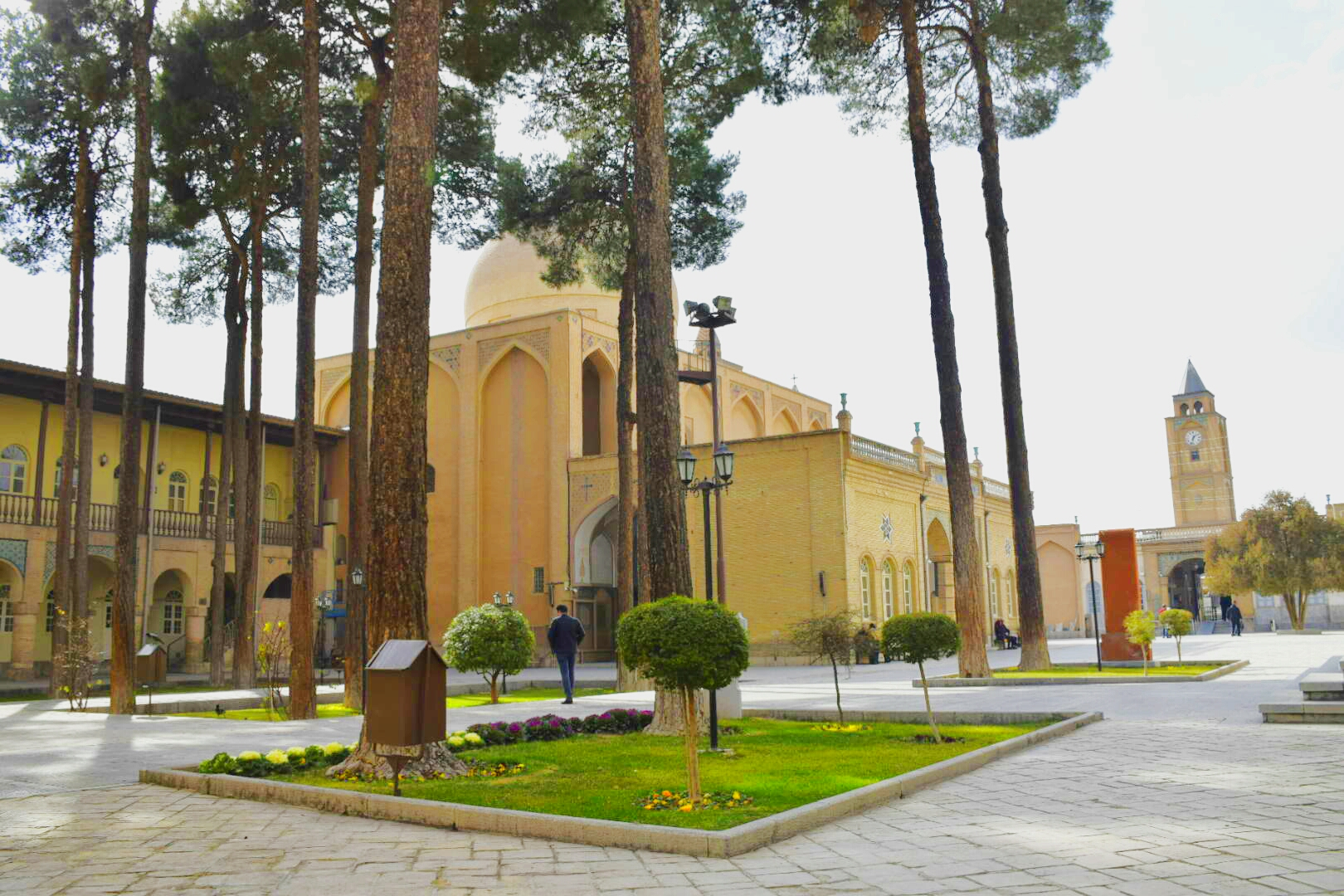
- Building of Diocese of Isfahan (left) and the church of St Joseph of Arimathea (right).

Location
- Country: Iran
- Territory: Isfahan and Southern Iran
- Headquarters: New Julfa
- Coordinates: 32°38′05″N 51°39′22″E

Information
- Denomination: Armenian Apostolic
- Established: 1606
- Cathedral: St. Joseph of Arimathea at the Holy Saviour Monastery, New Julfa, Isfahan, Iran
- Metropolitan Archbishop: Sipan Kashchian

Website
- www.vank.ir/fa

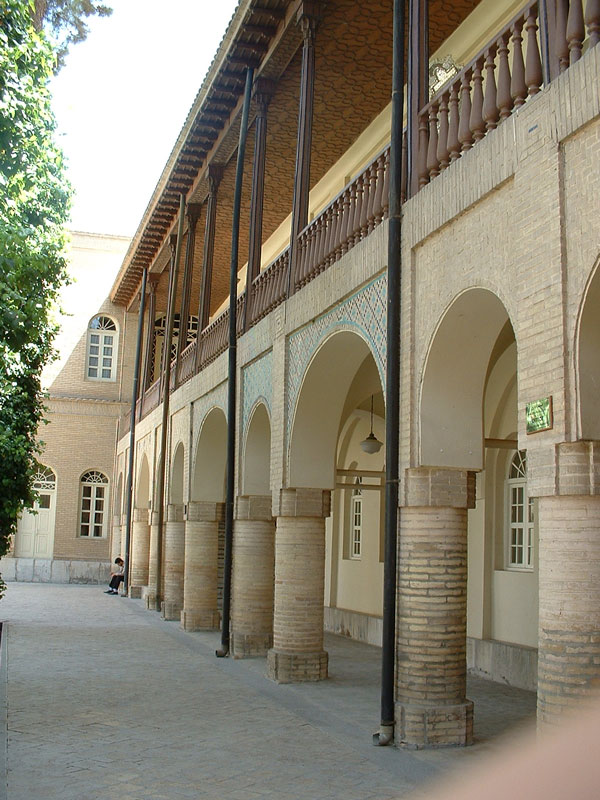
Building of Diocese of Isfahan in the Vank

The Armenian Prelacy of Isfahan, (Armenian: Սպահանի հայոց թեմ ; Persian: خلیفه‌گری ارامنه اصفهان) and also known as was called the Armenian Apostolic Diocese of Persia and India (Armenian: Իրանա-Հնդկաստանի հայոց թեմ ; Persian: خلیفه‌گری ارامنه ایران و هندوستان) is an Oriental Orthodox Christian diocese (or eparchy) of the Armenian Apostolic Church in New Julfa, Isfahan, Iran. It is one of three Iranian Armenian dioceses, alongside the Armenian Diocese of Atrpatakan and the Armenian Prelacy of Tehran.

The diocese was established in 1606 following the Great Surgun under Abbas the Great and its jurisdiction covers Isfahan, Khuzestan, and Ahvaz. It was under the ecclesiastical jurisdiction of the Mother See of Holy Etchmiadzin until 1958, when it transferred to the Holy See of Cilicia. Its center is the Vank Cathedral, and it is led by Archbishop Sipan Kashchian, the 36th prelate of the diocese. The prelacy serves about 7,000 people and oversees 12 churches and six schools.

== History ==
The Iranian Armenian has three diocese which is Armenian Diocese of Atrpatakan, centered in Tabriz; Armenian Prelacy of Isfahan, centered in Isfahan, and the Armenian Prelacy of Tehran, centered in Tehran. The diocese was founded in 1606 after Great Surgun which was carried out by Abbas the Great. Its center is the Vank Cathedral and its jurisdiction includes Isfahan, Khuzestan, and Ahvaz. Before 1958, it was under the ecclesiastical jurisdiction of Mother See of Holy Etchmiadzin before it moved to be within Holy See of Cilicia.Before 1958, it was under the ecclesiastical jurisdiction of the Mother See of Holy Etchmiadzin, after which it transferred to the Holy See of Cilicia.

The diocese served 10,000 people before Iranian Revolution and currently serve 7,000 people. Its parliamentary assembly is elected every three years and forms the diocesan council. It originally consisted of 24 churches, of which only 12 still exist. These include the Vank Cathedral, which was built over nine years starting in 1654 by David Jughayetsi. The Vank Cathedral houses a printing press, a museum, and a library, and it is also where the head of the diocese resides. The oldest churches in the diocese are the Saint Gevork Monastery of Mughni, built in 1611 by Khoja Nazar, and Saint Astvatsatsin, built by Khoja Avetik in 1613. There are two preschool, two boys', and two secondary schools in the diocese. The diocesan leader is currently headed by Archbishop Sipan Kashchian. The church has been led by 36 prelates.

== See also ==
- Armenians in Iran
