= Gregory IX of Cilicia =

Catholicos Gregory IX Mousabegian was the Catholicos of the Armenian Apostolic Church at Cilicia between 1439 and 1446.

== Biography ==
In 1439, the national clergy summoned Gregory IX, newly elected, to appear at Echmiadzin (now called Vagharshapat); it suspected that because of his Uniate leanings and friendliness towards Rome that he preferred to stay in Sis and declined the invitation. He also gave permission for the clergy to elect another Catholicos. The national synod of 700 bishops, clerics, and Armenian nobility met again in Echmiadzin in May of 1441 and elected Kyrakos of Virap as the new Catholics.

It is a riddle of history on what basis the election of a new Catholicos took place in Vagharshapat. It is unknown if Gregory was invited to return to Echmiadzin and refused or if he suggested that a new Catholicos be elected there. Some authorities in the 18th century suggested that this was the case and that the Catholicos said, "I will remain here and die and after my death the See of Sis will cease to exist of its own accord." Exact circumstances may never be known.

Some lists of the Armenian Catholicoi list him as only reigning for two years and consider him deposed after the 1441 election.

Whatever the case, he continued to reign as Catholicos in Cilicia until his death in 1446 and was succeeded as Catholicos at Cilicia by Garabed II and there have been two Catholicoi of the Armenian Apostolic Church ever since.

Preceded by Constantine VI of Cilicia	Catholicos of the Holy See of Cilicia; 1439–1446	Succeeded by Garabed II of Cilicia
