= Dzoravank =

Village in Gegharkunik, Armenia

Dzoravank Ձորավանք
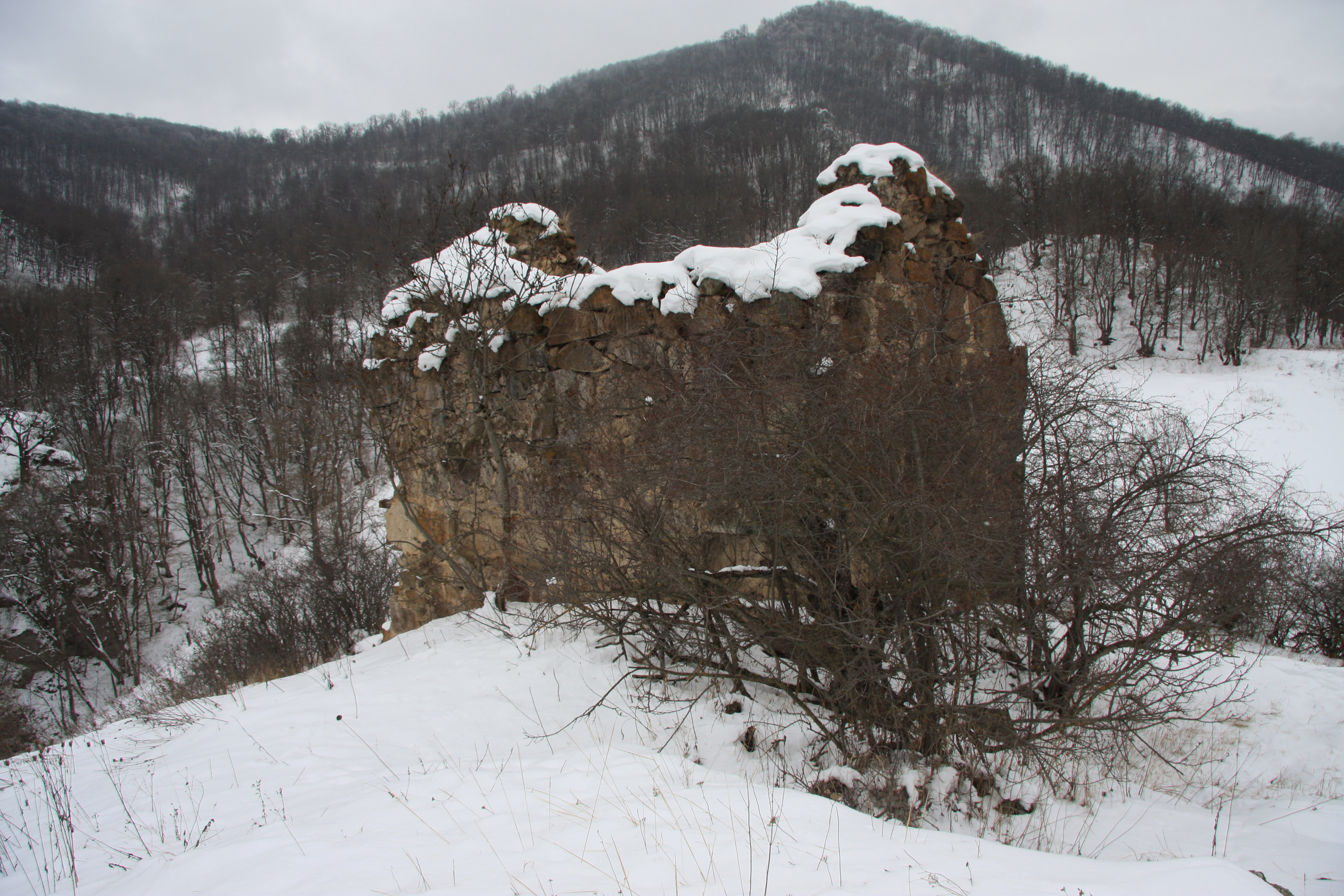
- Church in Dzoravank

- Location within Armenia Location within Gegharkunik
- Coordinates: 40°41′54″N 45°06′25″E
- Country: Armenia
- Province: Gegharkunik
- Municipality: Chambarak
- Elevation: 1,164 m (3,819 ft)

Population (2011)
  - Total: 176
- Time zone: UTC+4 (AMT)
- Postal code: 1314

Dzoravank (Armenian: Ձորավանք; Azerbaijani: Qaraqaya) is a village in the Chambarak Municipality of the Gegharkunik Province of Armenia. The village was populated by Azerbaijanis before the exodus of Azerbaijanis from Armenia after the outbreak of the Nagorno-Karabakh conflict. In 1988-1989 Armenian refugees from Azerbaijan settled in the village.

== Gallery ==
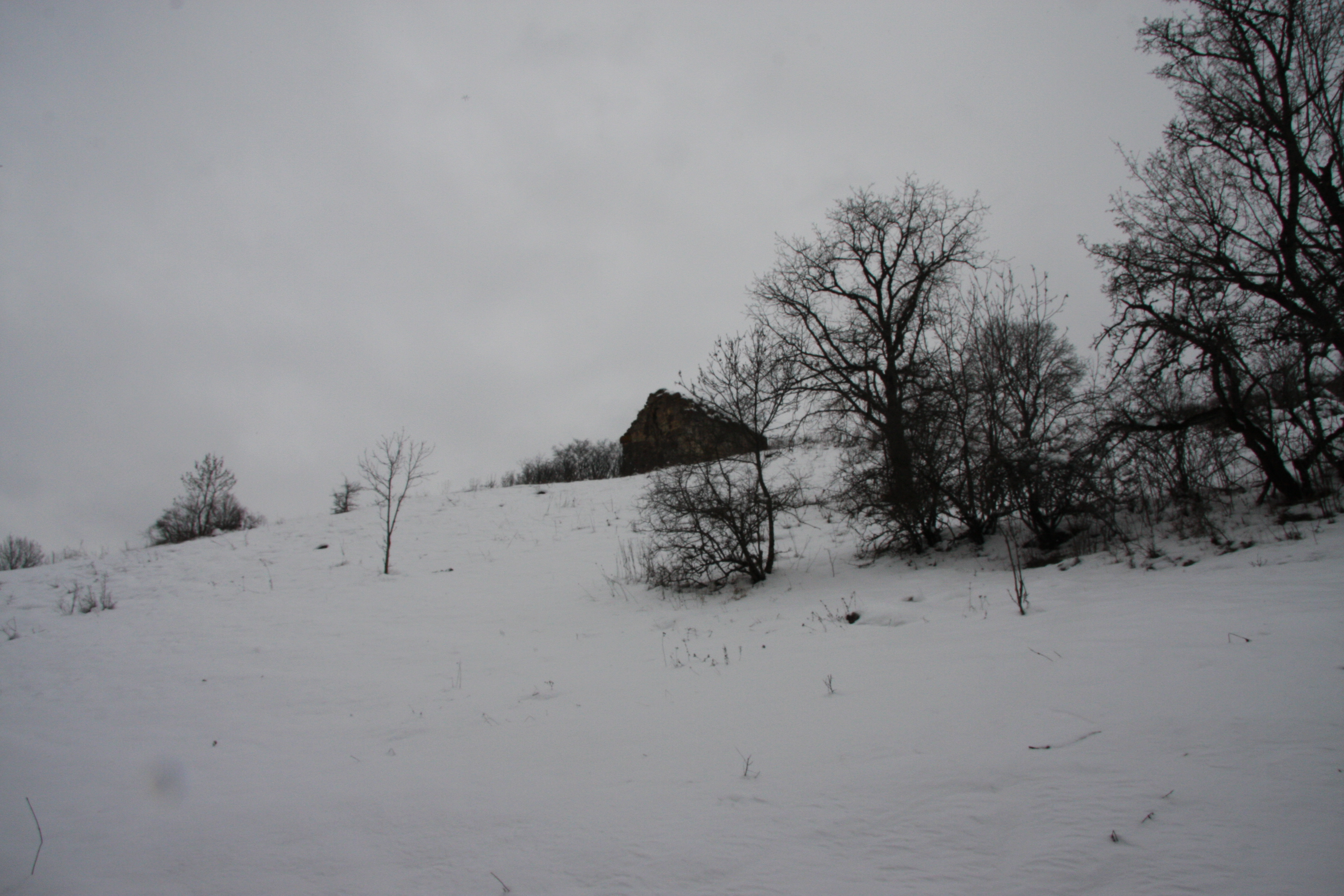
Scenery around Dzoravank Church in winter
