= Holy See of Cilicia =

Armenian Oriental Orthodox church

Catholicosate of the Great House of Cilicia Holy See of Cilicia
- Classification: Oriental Orthodox
- Primate: Catholicos Aram I
- Headquarters: Antelias, Lebanon; Previously Sis, Western Armenia
- Territory: Cilicia
- Possessions: Middle East, Europe, North America, South America, Oceania, and Africa.
- Founder: The Apostles Bartholomew and Thaddeus
- Independence: Apostolic Era
- Recognition: by Armenian Apostolic Church as an autocephalous church
- Members: 300,000
- Official website: Armenian Catholicosate of the Great House of Cilicia

The Armenian Catholicosate of the Great House of Cilicia (Armenian: Կաթողիկոսութիւն Հայոց Մեծի Տանն Կիլիկիոյ) is an autocephalous Oriental Orthodox church. Since 1930, the Catholicosate of the Great House of Cilicia has been headquartered in Antelias, Lebanon. Aram I is the Catholicos of Cilicia since 1995.

== Great House of Cilicia eras ==
- First Sis era, 267-301: According to the order of Catholicoi, *St. Gregory I the Enlightener (also known as Gregory the Illuminator) was seated in Sis 267-301 before moving to Etchmiadzin in 301 where he continued in office until 325.
- In 485 AD, the Catholicosate was transferred to the new capital of Armenia Dvin. In the 10th century it moved from Dvin to Dzoravank and then to Aghtamar (927 AD), to Arghina (947 AD) and to Ani (992 AD)
- Sivas era, 1058–1062
- Tavbloor era, 1062–1066
- Dzamendav (Zamidia, now Zamantı) era, 1066–1116
- Dzovk (Present aka Island of Gölcük and under the lake of Hazar), era, 1116–1149
- Hromgla (now Halfeti) era, 1149–1293
- Second Sis era, 1293-1930 (with the Catholicosate of All Armenians returned to Etchmiadzin in 1441)
- Antelias, Lebanon era, since 1930 - having transferred there from Sis in Cilicia in the aftermath of the Armenian genocide.

== Early history of the Armenian Church ==
The origin of the Armenian Church dates back to the Apostolic age and according to the ancient tradition was established by St. Thaddeus and St. Bartholomew. In 301 AD, Christianity was officially accepted by the Armenians as the state religion.

== Catholicosate in Sis (1293–1930) ==
The city of Sis (modern-day Kozan, Adana, Turkey) was the center of the Catholicosate of the Great House of Cilicia for more than six centuries, starting in 1293 when the Catholicosate moved from Hromgla to Sis. The monastery of St. Sophia of Sis, home of the Catholicosate, dominates the town in early 20th-century photographs. During the Armenian genocide, in 1915, the Armenian population in Cilicia was mostly destroyed.

=== Two Catholicosates starting in 1441 AD ===
In 1441, a new Catholicos of All Armenians was elected in Holy Etchmiadzin in the person of Kirakos I Virapetsi of Armenia. At the same time the retiring Catholicos in Sis Gregory IX Mousabegian (1439–1446) remained as the Catholicos of the Great House of Cilicia. Therefore, since 1441, there have been two Catholicosates in the Armenian Apostolic Church. The Catholicos of All Armenians resides in the Mother See of Holy Etchmiadzin.

== Modern history of the church (1930–present) ==
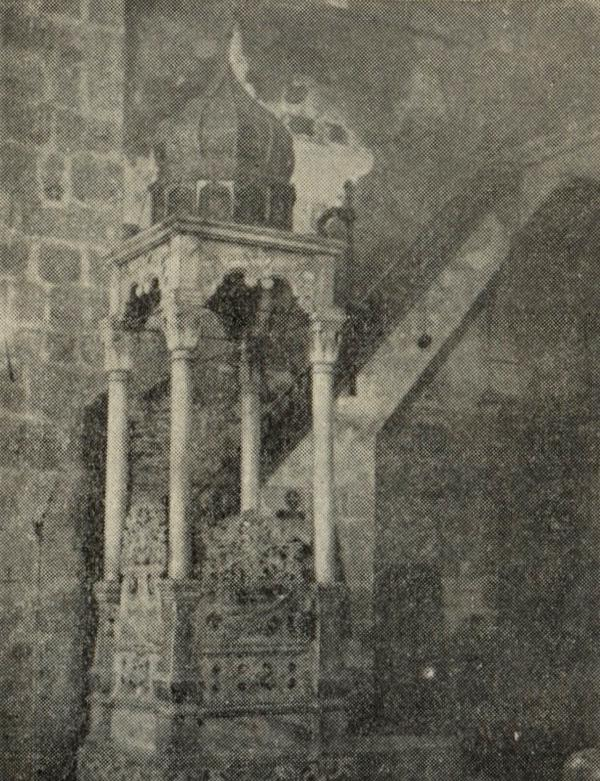
The chair of the Armenian Catholicosate in Sis (today Kozan)

In 1922 the American Committee for Relief in the Near East established an orphanage in Antilias for survivors of the genocide. It continued operating until 1928. After the foundation's Executive Committee was petitioned in 1929 by Sahak II, in 1930 the now-vacant buildings of the orphanage were leased to the Cilicia Catholicosate for a period of five years to be used as a seat for the Catholicosate and a seminary for training priests and teachers. The foundation also agreed to contribute $6000-$7000 yearly towards running costs.

=== United States of America ===
Due to intrasectarian disputes within the Armenian community in the United States dating back to the 1930s and 1940s, the Lebanese Cilician See established its presence in the United States of America in 1957. These disputes were political and resulted in the segregation of approximately a few hundred thousand Armenians. Archbishop Khoren of Lebanon was sent by the Supreme Patriarch Zareh I to the United States as a representative of the Holy See of Cilicia. The segregated part of the Armenian community in the United States became members of the Lebanese Holy See of Cilicia, as they had been barred from attending Armenian churches before. This expansion of the Holy See of Cilicia led to an increase in its power and amount of churches.

== Publications ==
=== Hask ===
The Catholicossate has its own publishing house and has a number of publications, most notably the monthly "Hask" (in Armenian Հասկ), the official organ of the Holy See of Cilicia.

=== Hask Armenological Review ===
It also publishes the annual "Hask Armenological Review" (in Armenian Հասկ Հայագիտական Հանդէս) on Armenian studies.

== Dioceses of the Holy See of Cilicia ==
=== Current Dioceses ===
- Armenian Prelacy of Lebanon, based in Beirut
- Armenian Prelacy of Aleppo, based in Aleppo
- Armenian Prelacy of Jezireh, based in Qamishli
- Armenian Prelacy of Isfahan, based in New Julfa
- Armenian Prelacy of Atrpatakan, in Tabriz
- Armenian Prelacy of Tehran, based in Tehran (Saint Sarkis Cathedral)
- Armenian Prelacy of Kuwait & Neighboring Countries, based in Kuwait City
- Armenian Prelacy of the United Arab Emirates & Qatar, based in Abu Dhabi
- Armenian Prelacy of Cyprus, based in Nicosia
- Armenian Prelacy of Greece, based in Athens
- Armenian Prelacy of Canada, based in Montreal
- Armenian Prelacy of the Eastern United States, based in Manhattan, New York
- Armenian Prelacy of the Western United States, based in Sunland-Tujunga, Los Angeles
- Armenian Prelacy of Venezuela, based in Caracas

=== Former Dioceses as of 1915 ===
- Armenian Prelacy of Sis, based in Kozan
- Armenian Prelacy of Adana, based in Adana
- Armenian Prelacy of Hadjin, based in Saimbeyli
- Armenian Prelacy of Payas, based in Payas
- Armenian Prelacy of Germanik or Marash, based in Kahramanmaraş
- Armenian Prelacy of Ulnia or Zeytun, based in Süleymanlı
- Armenian Prelacy of Firnouze, based in Fırnız
- Armenian Prelacy of Aintab, based in Gaziantep
- Armenian Prelacy of Antiok, based in Antakya
- Armenian Prelacy of Malatia, based in Malatya
- Armenian Prelacy of Yozghat, based in Yozgat
- Armenian Prelacy of Gyurin, based in Gürün
- Armenian Prelacy of Tevrik, based in Divriği
- Armenian Prelacy of Daranda, based in Darende

== See also ==
- Armenian Apostolic Church
- Mother See of Holy Etchmiadzin
- List of Armenian catholicoi of Cilicia
