= Antelias =

Antelias أنطلياس
- City
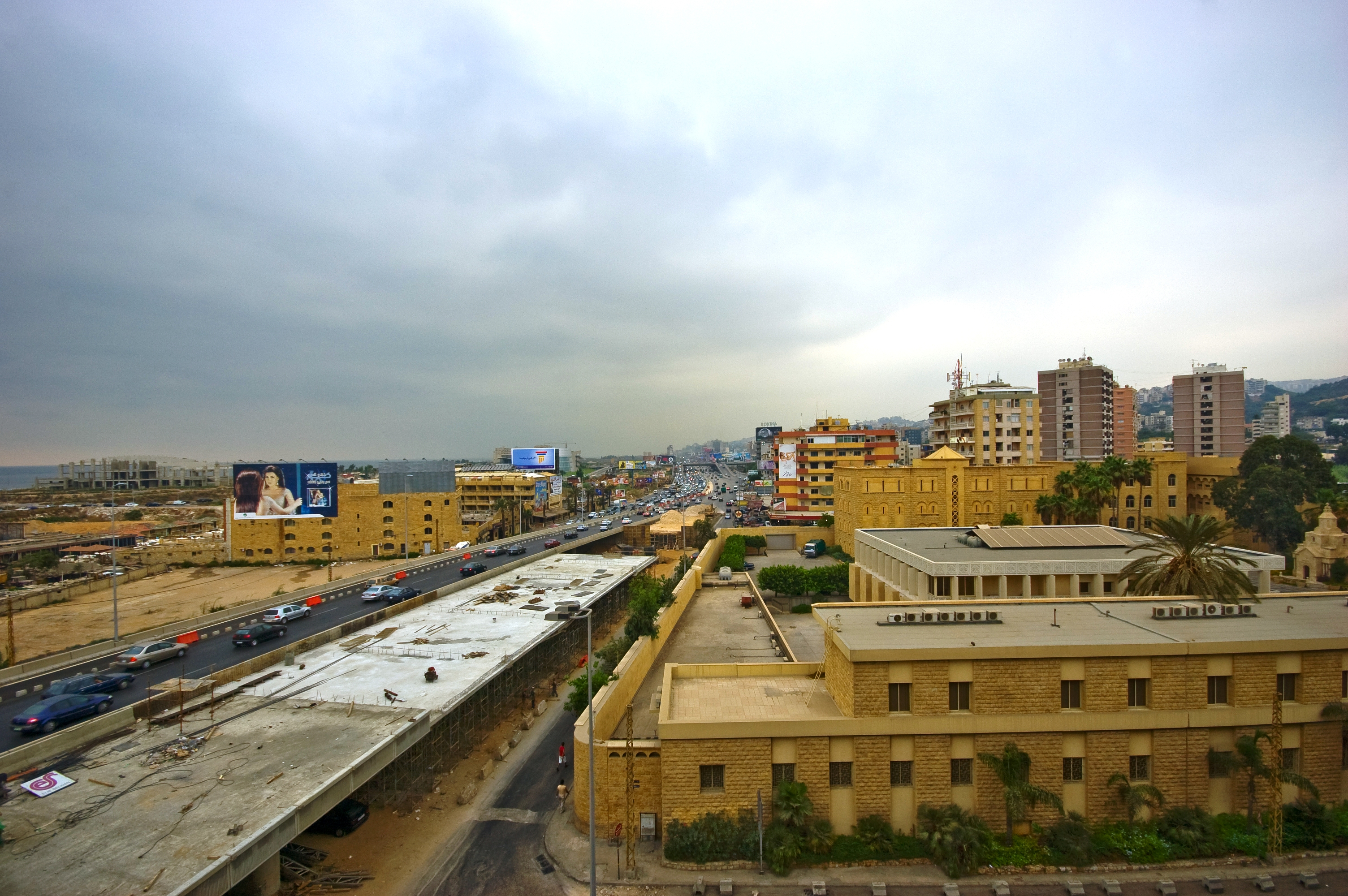

- Location within Lebanon
- Coordinates: 33°55′0″N 35°36′0″E
- Country: Lebanon
- Governorate: Mount Lebanon Governorate
- District: Matn District
- Mayor: Georges E. Abou Jaoude
- Time zone: UTC+2 (EET)
  - Summer (DST): UTC+3 (EEST)
- Dialing code: +961

Antelias (Arabic: أنطلياس) is a city in Lebanon in the Matn District of the Mount Lebanon Governorate. It is located around 5 km to the north of Beirut.

== Etymology ==
The name is originally Greek, ἀντήλιος – from ἀντί(anti) "contra" and ἥλιος (helios) "sun" – meaning "facing the sun".

== Municipality ==
The municipality of Antelias - Naqqach (Note: also transliterated as Naccache) is located in the Kaza of Metn in Mount Lebanon, one of the eight mohafazats (governorates) of Lebanon. Antelias - Naqqach is 8 kilometers (4.9712 mi) from Beyrouth (Beirut), the capital of Lebanon. Its elevation is 10 meters (32.81 ft; 10.936 yd) above sea level. Antelias - Naqqach surface stretches for 193 hectares (1.93 km^{2} - 0.74498 mi^{2}).

== Archaeological interest ==
Antelias is home to the site of Ksar Akil, where the region's oldest remains of a human being have been found: a 30,000-year-old man near the caves of Ksar Akil. The skull of the body found was sent to the Beirut National Museum and the remains were shipped to the United States for conservation and study. Those caves are also well coveted by known speleologists who have explored their passageways. Antelias Cave was also located 2.5 kilometres (1.6 mi) east of the town until it was completely destroyed by dynamite in 1964. Discoveries from Antelias are housed at the Museum of Lebanese Prehistory.

Antelias is also the site of the St-Elie Church, built in 1895. The St-Elie Church holds celebrations on the week of 20 July. A variety of activities are offered to the public such as plays, concerts, a fair and food, sweet stands and fireworks.

== Historical interest ==
Antelias (The St Elie Convent in particular) was the venue for the signature of a historical treaty (in Arabic: عامية أنطلياس Ammiyat Antelias) between several communities in Lebanon to unite against the oppression of the Egyptian occupation and their allies in the mid-19th century, precisely in 1840. The Christian and Druze communities were the main parties in that treaty. The treaty did not however prevent a fierce war between the two parties in 1860 which led to the deaths of tens of thousands of victims.

On 29 March 1991 a car bomb in Antelias killed three people.

The first building containing an elevator was built in Antelias, it was built by the Chemali family.

== Religion ==
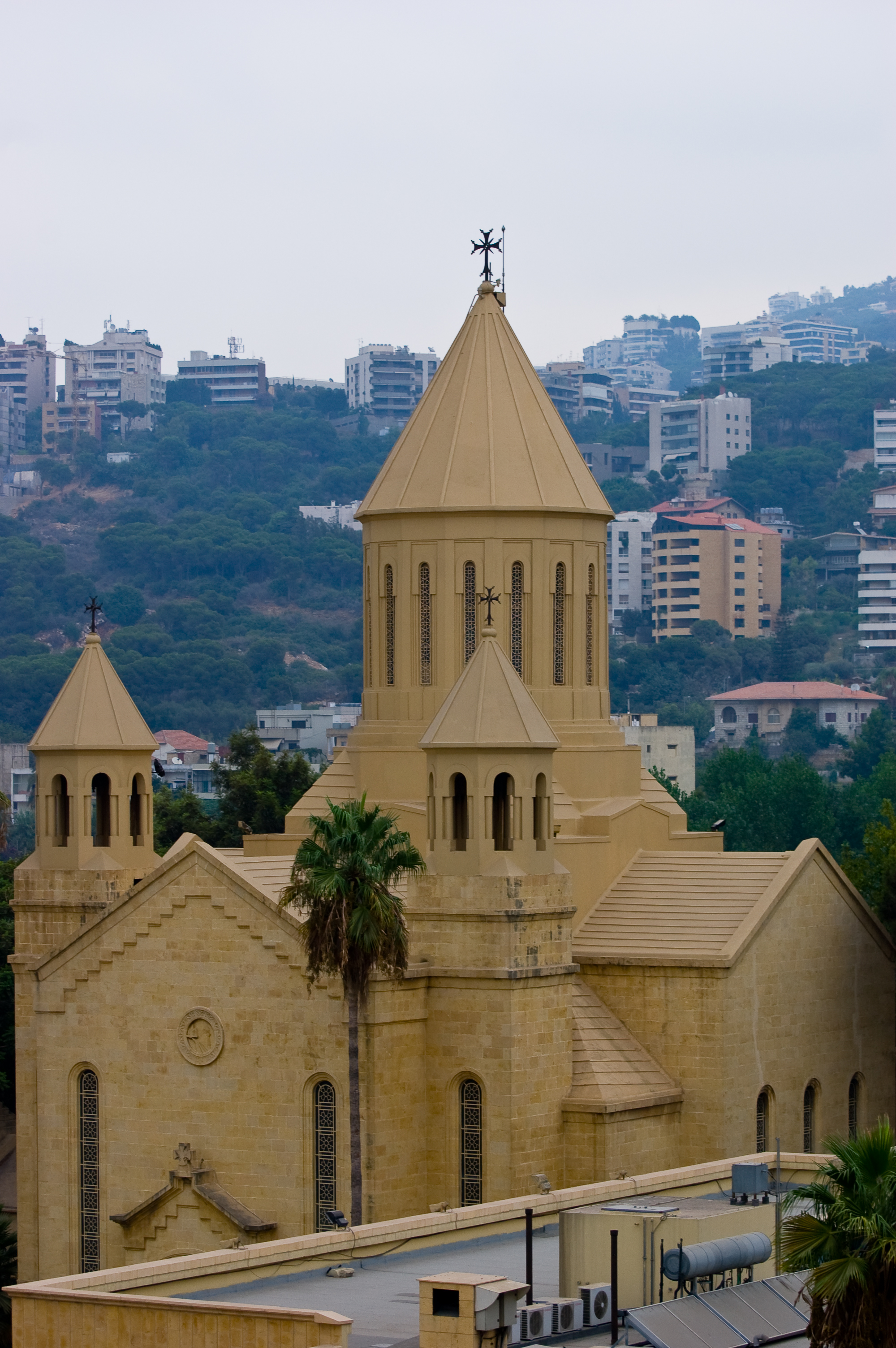
The St. Gregory the Illuminator Armenian Cathedral at the Holy See of Cilicia

Antelias is the seat of the Catholicos of Cilicia of the Armenian Catholicosate of the Great House of Cilicia.

Its Cathedral of St. Elias is the episcopal see of the Maronite Catholic Archeparchy of Antelias.

Other important religious buildings include the St-Elie Maronite convent with its two churches and the St. Mikhael Greek Orthodox Church.

== Geography ==
Antelias is composed of a coastal fertile plain and a hilly region more to the east. There is also a more narrow plain on the sides of the Antelias river, which originates from a nearby source (Fawar) and runs east west to discharge in the Mediterranean Sea. Antelias river is highly eutrophied due to the strong urbanization and the harmful effect of the untreated used waters.

Until the early 1990s, the coastal plain of Antelias mostly consisted of open areas planted with orange and banana trees. Very few houses could be seen in the coastal plain. The strips along the Antelias river also used to be planted with orange trees.

Due to the vast urbanization since the second half of the last century, most green areas have been removed and replaced by residential and commercial buildings, thus creating a serious environmental impact on the area. Very few if any such green areas still exist.

=== Strategic position ===
Antelias is considered the gate to the northern Matn regions. The Matn is one of the most prosperous regions of Lebanon, including a number of factories, commercial malls and important schools.

Antelias is situated between Beirut and the city of Jounieh and its coastal highway witnesses a daily rush of traffic. As previously stated, Antelias is the gateway to Bikfaya, Dhour el Chweir, Baskinta and Aintoura, all renowned summer resorts and the Antelias-Bikfaya road is well known to play that linkage role.

== Commercial interest ==
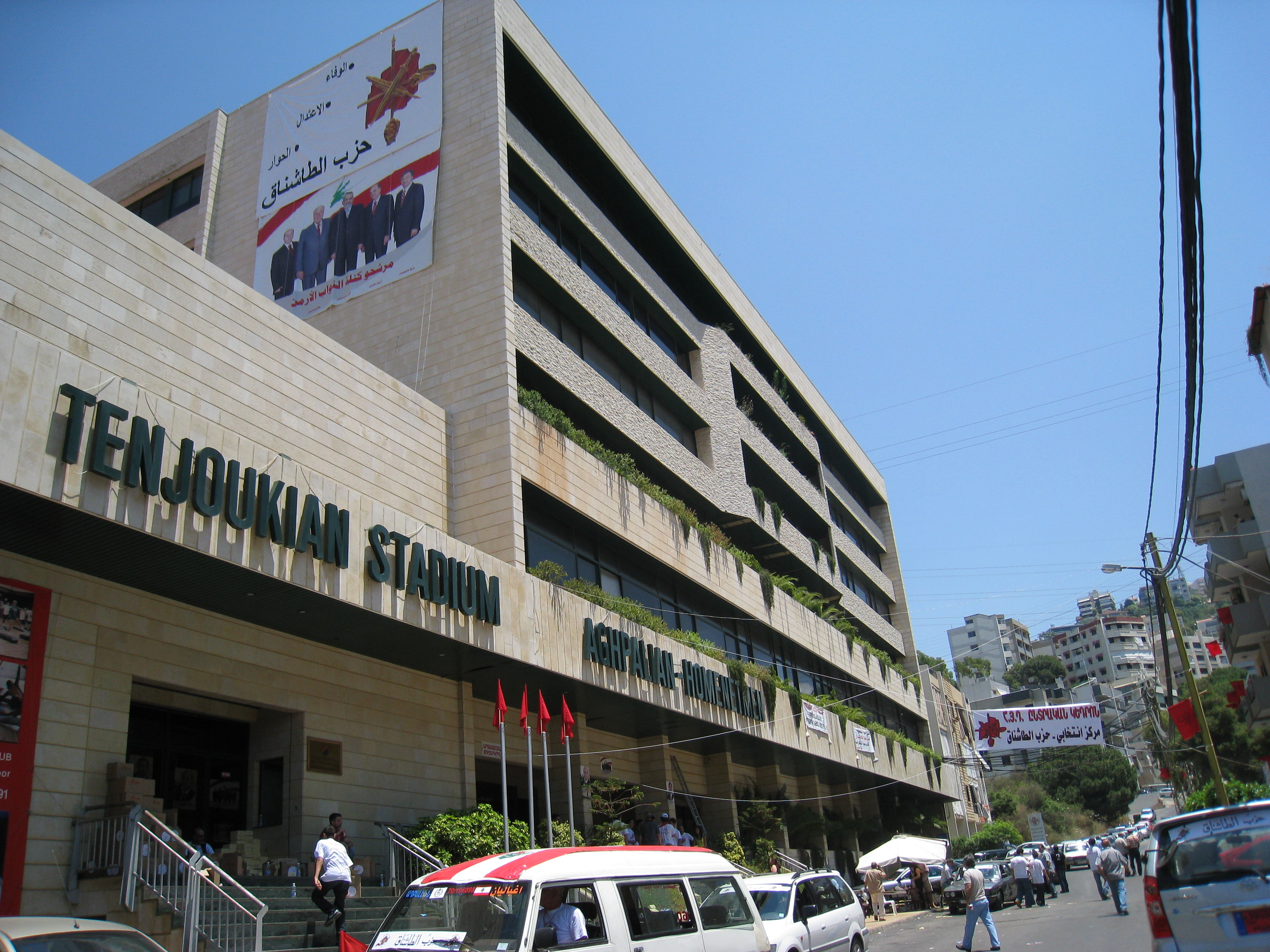
Tenjougian Sports Arena at the Aghpalian-Homenetmen Center, Antelias

Antelias holds many malls such as ABC and Le Mall, supermarkets such as Spinneys and Bou Kahlil and movie theaters Cine St Elie, Grands Cinemas and CineMall. Adding to this a street dedicated to banks, that has more than five different banks. Antelias has also a strip that offers a selection of different restaurants offering a variety of cuisines such as Japanese: Yen, Yabani and Tsunami, Lebanese : Petit cafe, Keif and Lebnene, American:Spot and Public, Italian: Pinocchio, Mexican: Carlito's and French: L'escroc.

== Touristic interest ==
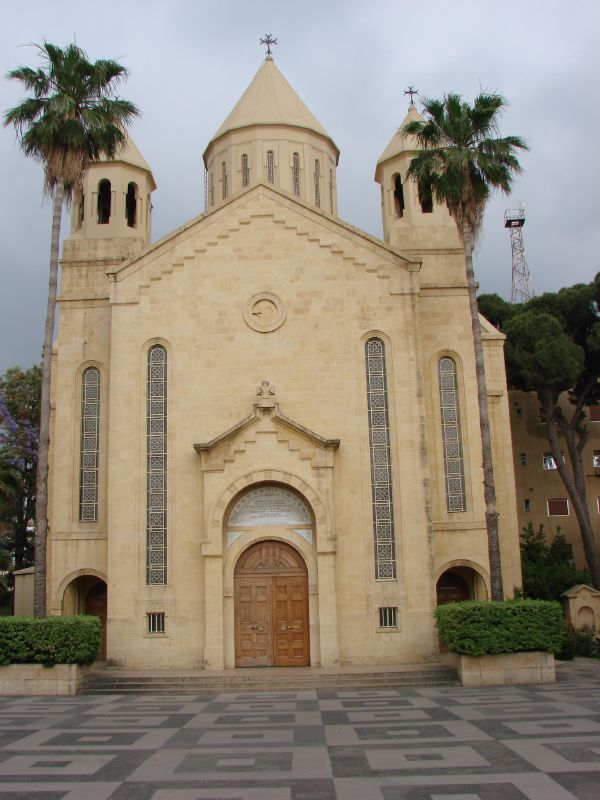
The Saint Gregory the Illuminator Cathedral (1940) at the Armenian Catholicossate of Cilicia

Antelias is the home to a large Marina and beach front that attracts people from neighbouring and even distant localities. Garden Tower was the first hotel built in Antelias area, in the immediate vicinity of the Catholicosate of Cilicia. Also Antelias has a very famous river that passes through its streets.

== Cultural interest ==
Antelias features an annual Book Fair event sponsored by the Antelias Cultural Movement. The Cultural Movement itself is an organization headquartered in Antelias and it holds periodic events such as political discussions, book reviews, theatrical plays and the like.

Antelias is also the home of the Rahbani Brothers who have given so much to the World Music Heritage. Antelias inspired the Rahbanis for years. There is also a street dedicated to the Rahbani brothers in Antelias.
