= Nicosia Armenian school =

Armenian School in Nicosia, Cyprus

Nareg Armenian School
- Αρμενικό Σχολείο Ναρέκ (Greek); Նարեկ Հայկական Վարժարան (Armenian)
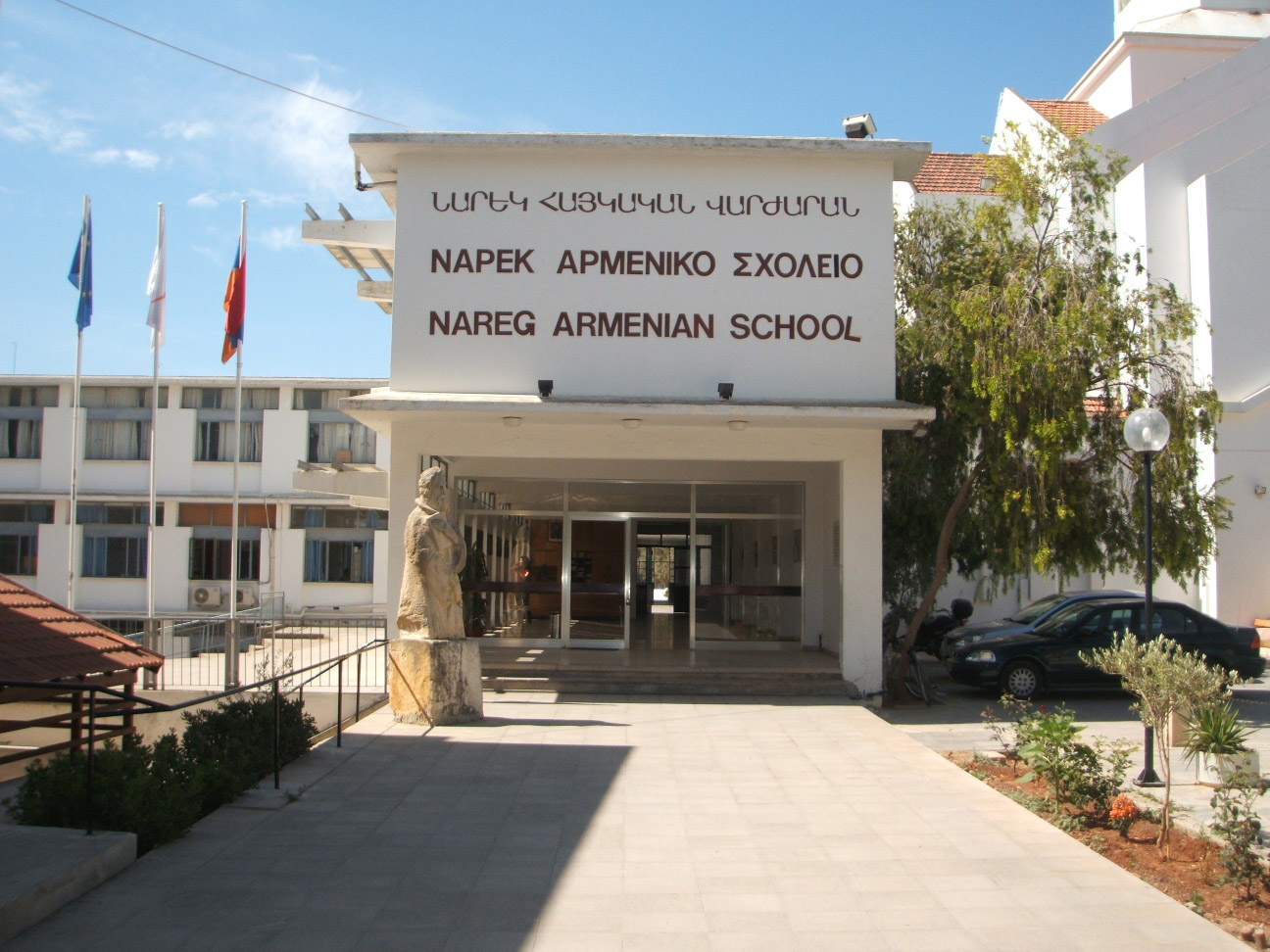
- Main entrance view

Location
- Nicosia, Cyprus; 35°9′7″N 33°22′3″E

Information
- Founded: 1870; 156 years ago
- School district: Nicosia

The Nareg Armenian School (Greek: Αρμενικό Σχολείο Ναρέκ; Armenian: Նարեկ Հայկական Վարժարան), also known as the Nicosia Armenian School, is located on 47, Armenia street in Strovolos, Nicosia, between the Armenian Prelature of Cyprus building and the Holy Mother of God cathedral.

== Institution ==
Since 1972, Armenian Elementary Schools in Cyprus (Nicosia, Larnaca, Limassol and, until 1974, Famagusta) are called Nareg, in memory of Saint Krikor Naregatsi (951–1003). The current building was built between 1971 and 1972 by the Technical Services of the Ministry of Education and was inaugurated on 12 November 1972 by Archbishop Makarios III and Catholicos Khoren I of Cilicia.

Currently, the school has about 120 students. As with the other Nareg Schools (in Larnaca and Limassol), Vera Tahmazian has been the Headmistress since 2009, and the school is under the tutelage of the Armenian Schools of Cyprus Committee. Additionally, since 2005, following the unjust closure of the Melkonian Educational Institute, Nareg Gymnasium (Junior High School) operates on the same premises, with about 25 students.

== History ==
The first Armenian school in Nicosia was established on Victoria street in 1870 by Archimandrite Vartan Mamigonian. In 1886, Fr. Hovhannes Shahinian renovated the building and called it "Vartanants Boys' School". In 1902, Archimandrite Bedros Saradjian erected the "Shoushanian Girls' School". The two schools operated simultaneously, until in 1921, following the death of local landowner Artin Bey Melikian from Kythrea, his children respected his will for the erection of the co-educational "Melikian National School". Initially, the school building was considered too big, but only a year later it was full of Armenian children who survived the Armenian Genocide. In 1938, entrepreneur Dickran Ouzounian erected the also co-educational "Ouzounian National School" next to it. As of 1939, the two schools assumed the name "Melikian-Ouzounian National School", under which they operated until 1963. In 1950, the new kindergarten building was built, using proceeds from school events.

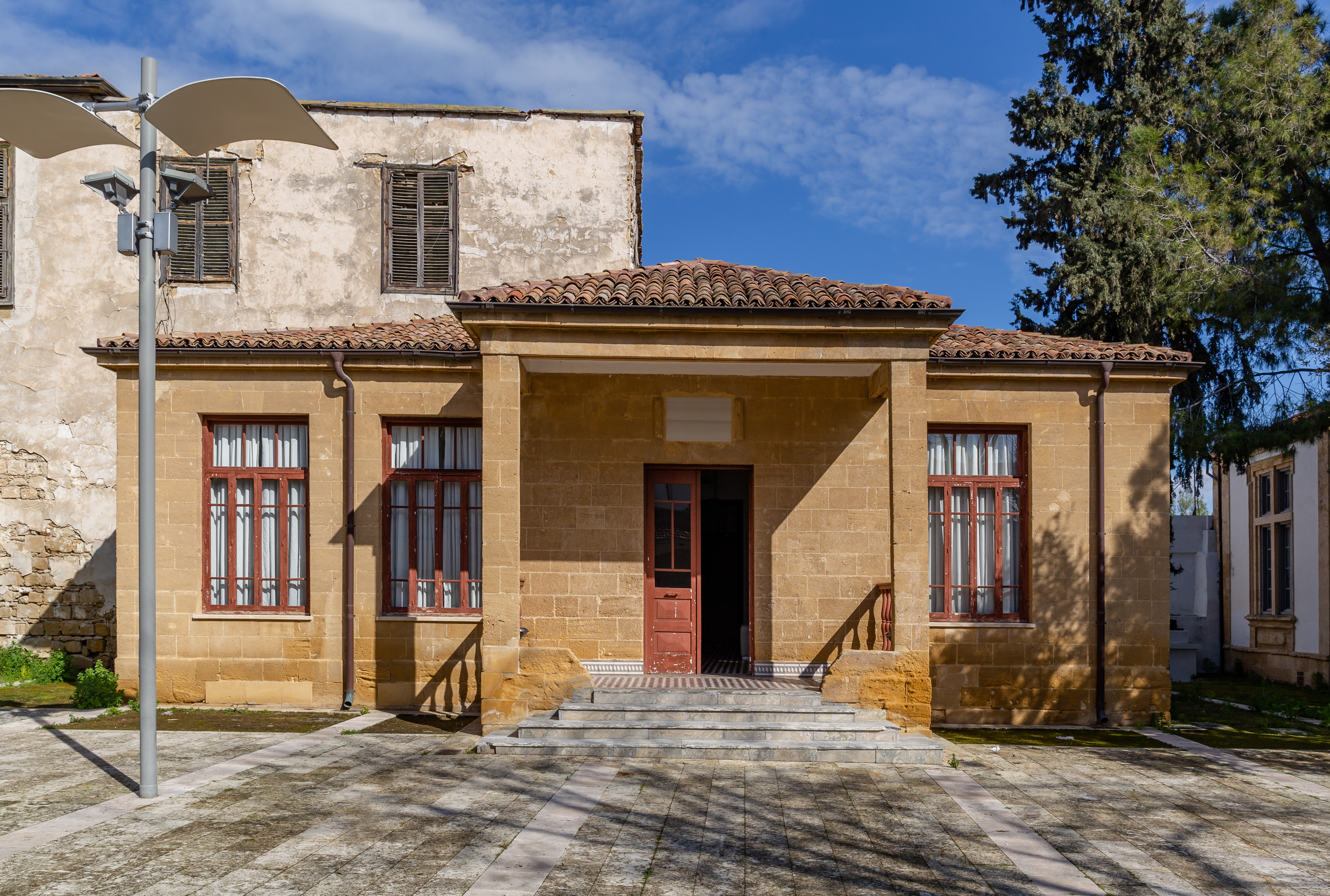
The Ouzounian school building

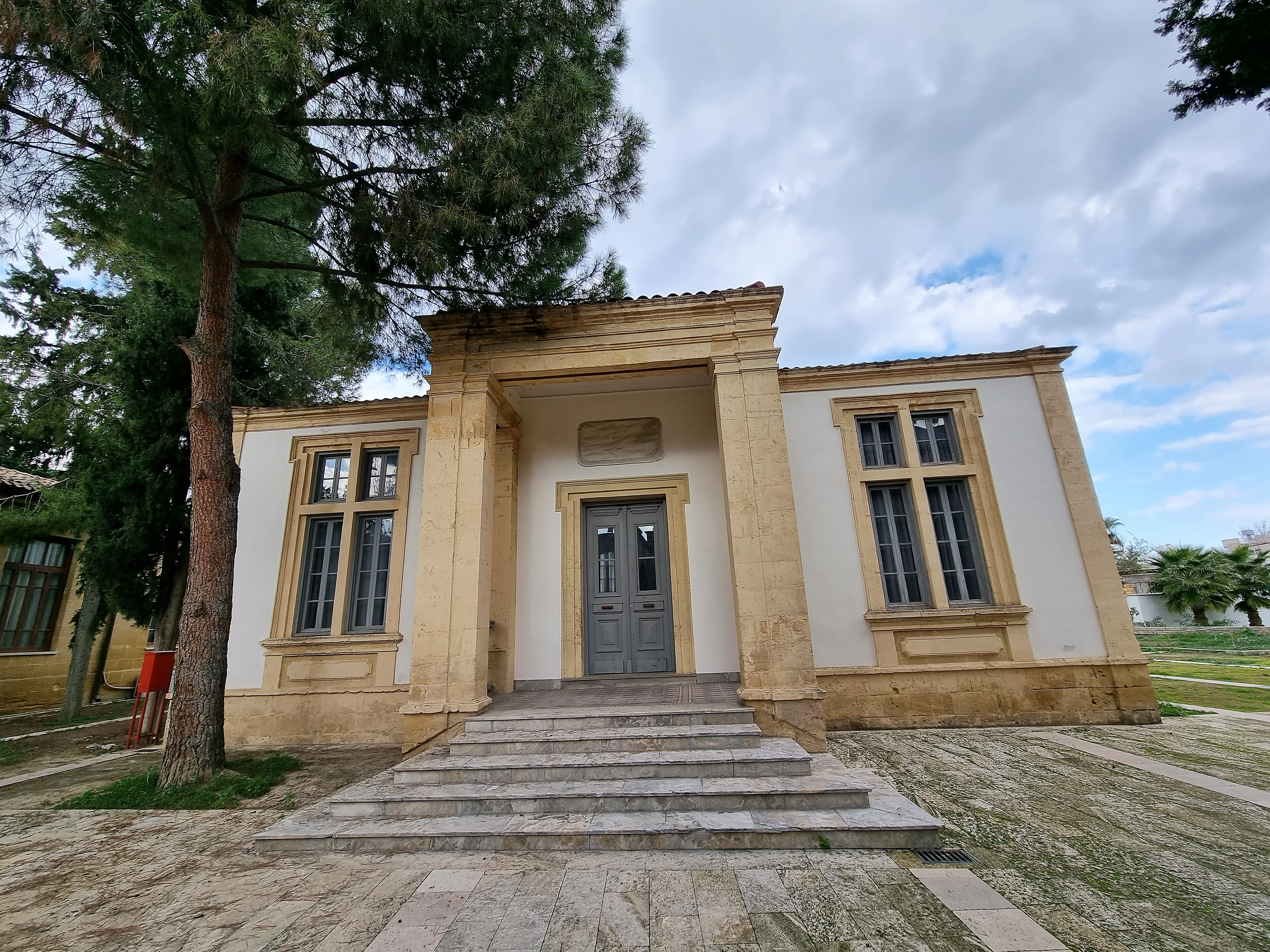
The Melikian school building

Along with the rest of the Armenian Quarter, the school premises were taken over by the TMT during the 1963-1964 inter-communal troubles. For about a month, no classes took place, but as of February 1964 the school was housed at the Mitsis building on Archbishop Makarios III Avenue until June 1964. Thanks to arrangements by Armenian Representative and Chairman of the Melkonian's School Board Berge Tilbian, and with full government aid, from September 1964 until June 1972 school life continued in two pre-fabricated buildings on the grounds of the Melkonian Educational Institute's football field, called “National Armenian School”.

Thanks to the efforts of Representative Dr. Antranik L. Ashdjian, between 1971 and 1972 the Ministry of Education constructed the current building of Nareg Armenian Elementary School in Acropolis, on land granted in 1966 to the community by the government, thanks to arrangements made by Representative Berge Tilbian.

The new auditorium was built between 2008–2010 and was inaugurated on 17 May 2011 by Minister of Education and Culture Dr Andreas Demetriou.

== See also ==
- Armenian Cypriots
- Armenian Prelature of Cyprus
- Holy Mother of God Cathedral, Nicosia
- Notre Dame de Tyre
