= Armenian Prelature of Cyprus =

Prelature of Cyprus Կիպրոսի Թեմ
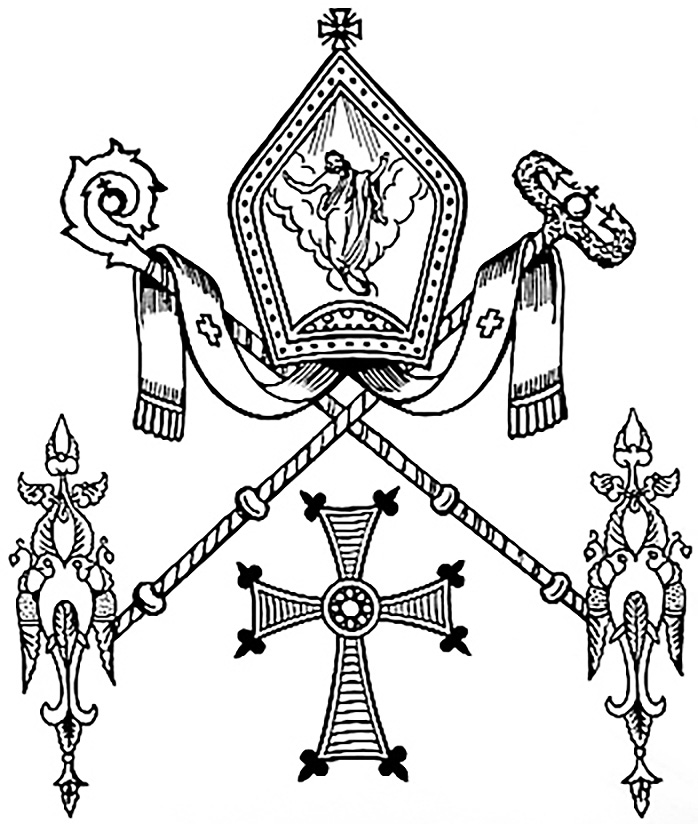
- Armenian Prelature of Cyprus emblem

Location
- Country: Cyprus

Statistics
- Population: Total: (as of 2020); ~4,000 (est.)

Information
- Denomination: Armenian Apostolic Church
- Rite: Armenian Rite
- Established: 973
- Cathedral: Holy Mother of God Cathedral, Nicosia

Current leadership
- Patriarch: Aram I
- Catholicosal Vicar: Archbishop Gomidas Ohanian

Armenian Prelature of Cyprus (Armenian: Առաջնորդարան Հայոց Կիպրոսի) is one of the oldest dioceses of the Armenian Apostolic Church outside historic Armenian territories, and the oldest one under the jurisdiction of the Catholicosate of the Great House of Cilicia. It was established in 973 AD and currently has around 4,000 followers, comprising around 95% of the Armenians in Cyprus.

The seat of the prelature is the Holy Mother of God Cathedral in Nicosia. The prelature building is situated next to the cathedral, on 47 Armenia street, Strovolos, Nicosia. Archbishop Gomidas Ohanian is currently the catholicosal vicar, appointed on 19 July 2024. Archbishop Gomidas arrived in Cyprus on 1 August 2024.

== History ==
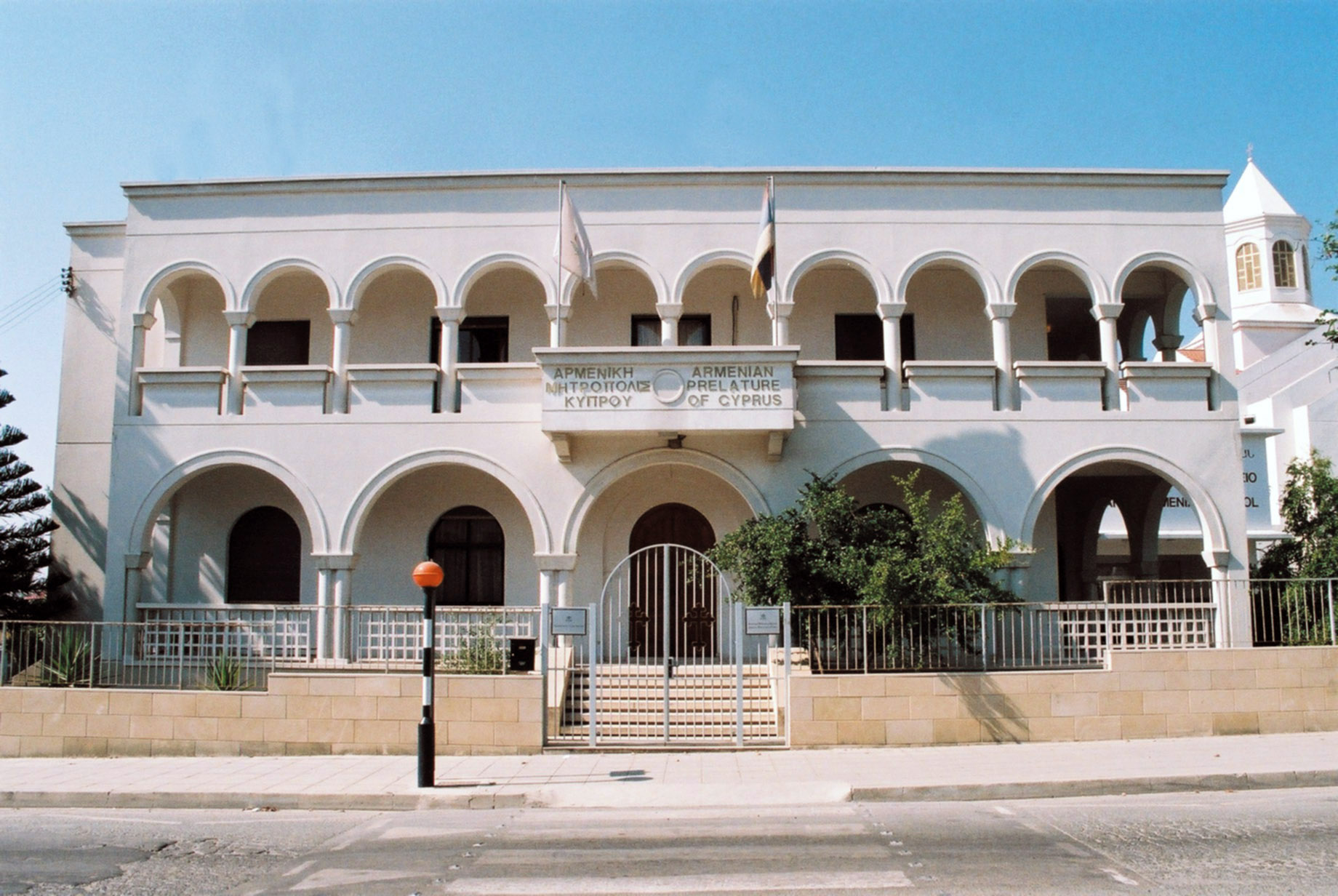
The building of the Armenian Prelature of Cyprus in Strovolos, Nicosia

The Armenian Prelature of Cyprus was established in 973 by Catholicos Khatchig I. In the years that followed, some of its Prelates participated in important church synods, such as Tateos (who participated in the Council of Hromkla in 1179), Nigoghaos (who participated in the Synod of Sis in 1307) and Krikor (who participated in a conference of Greek Orthodox Bishops in Cyprus in 1340). The antiquity of the Armenian Church in Cyprus was confirmed by a bull of Pope Leo X, which was issued in 1519 after multiple discords, according to which the Armenian Prelate would be senior to and take precedence over the Maronite, Jacobite and Coptic prelates.

Historically, the prelature has been under the jurisdiction of the Catholicosate of the Great House of Cilicia, while today it is the oldest theme that falls under its jurisdiction. During the Ottoman era and early British era, for various reasons, it was at times under the Armenian Patriarchate of Jerusalem (1775–1799, 1812–1837, 1848–1861, 1865–1877, 1888–1897 and 1898–1908), the Armenian Patriarchate of Constantinople (1759–1775, 1799–1812, 1861–1864, 1877–1888, 1897–1898 and 1908–1921), and the Catholicosate of Etchmiadzin (1864–1865). Cyprus was the place of refuge for two exiled Armenian Patriarchs of Constantinople, Archbishop Tavit Areveltsi (1644–1648) and Senior Archimandrite Krikor Basmadjian (1773–1775).

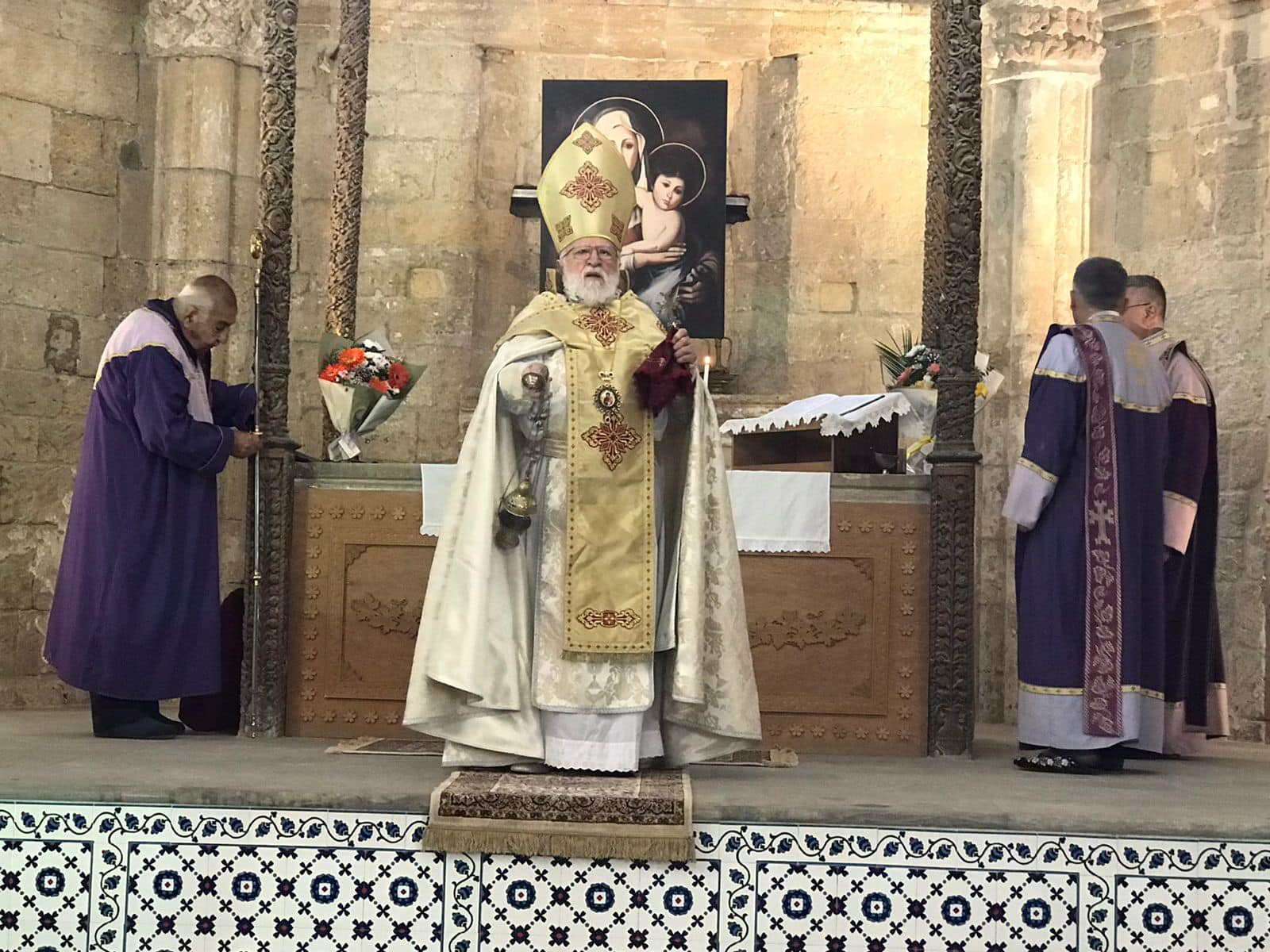
Archbishop Gomidas officiating in the old Virgin Mary cathedral, occupied Nicosia (2024)

For centuries, the prelature building was located within the Armenian compound in Victoria street in walled Nicosia; when that area was taken over by Turkish-Cypriot extremists in 1963–1964, the prelature was temporarily housed in Aram Ouzounian street (1964–1969) and, later on, in Kyriakos Matsis street in Ayios Dhometios (1969–1983).

== Current situation ==
The current catholicosal vicar is, as of 19 July 2024, Archbishop Gomidas Ohanian who arrived in Cyprus on 1 August 2024. The parish priest in Nicosia is Archpriest Momik Habeshian (since 6 January 2000), the parish priest in Larnaca is Archpriest Mashdots Ashkarian (since 9 January 1992) and the spiritual shepherd in Limassol is Senior Archimandrite Hovhannes Saghdejian (since 17 October 2024); Momik Habeshian was ordained at the Holy Mother of God Cathedral on 19 December 1999 by Bishop Varoujan Hergelian. The clergymen’s work is aided by the following ordained deacons and stole-bearers: Levon Arakelian, Antranik A. Ashdjian, Haig Aynedjian, Hagop Bohdjelian, Megerdich Gostanian, Stepan Haroutiunian, Souren Hidirian, Hovig Hovhannessian, Vahakn Kazandjian, Shant Sarkissian, Nareg Tavitian, Sebouh Tavitian, Vatche Toundjikian, Haig Utidjian and Onnig Yenovkian, as well as by some ordained acolytes and non-ordained individuals who serve the church.

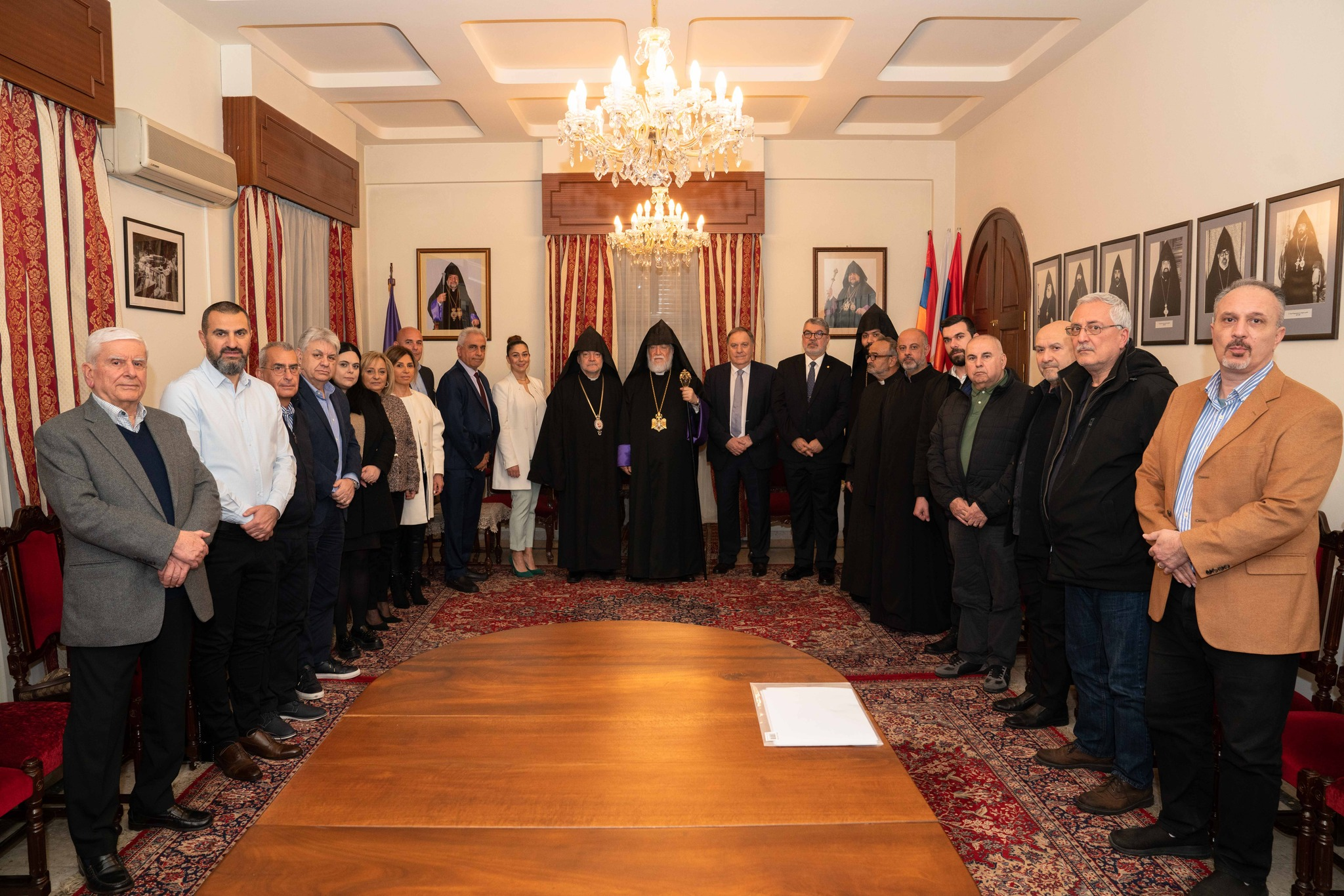
The Armenian Ethnarchy of Cyprus in the Prelature's consistory with Catholicos Aram I (2023)

A new prelature building was erected in 1983 and 1984 due to the efforts of Bishop Zareh Aznavorian and with financial aid from the Evangelical Church of Westphalia. The new building is located next to the Holy Mother of God Cathedral and the Nareg school and was designed by architects Charilaos Dikaios and Athos Dikaios. It was officially inaugurated on 4 March 1984, during the pastoral visit of Catholicos Karekin II. It was renovated in 2017 and 2018, in part due to the contribution of the Government of Cyprus.

By the initiative of Bishop Varoujan Hergelian, in 1998 the basement of the building was renovated and the "Vahram Utidjian" Hall was created; previously a store room, its creation was funded from the proceeds of the 1994 auction of the art collection that Vahram Utidjian had donated to the prelature in 1954. It was inaugurated on 3 February 1999 by Catholicos Aram I; numerous charity, communal and cultural events take place there. The prelature's consistory houses a collection of ecclesiastical relics, some of which were previously in the Notre Dame de Tyre church or the Magaravank.

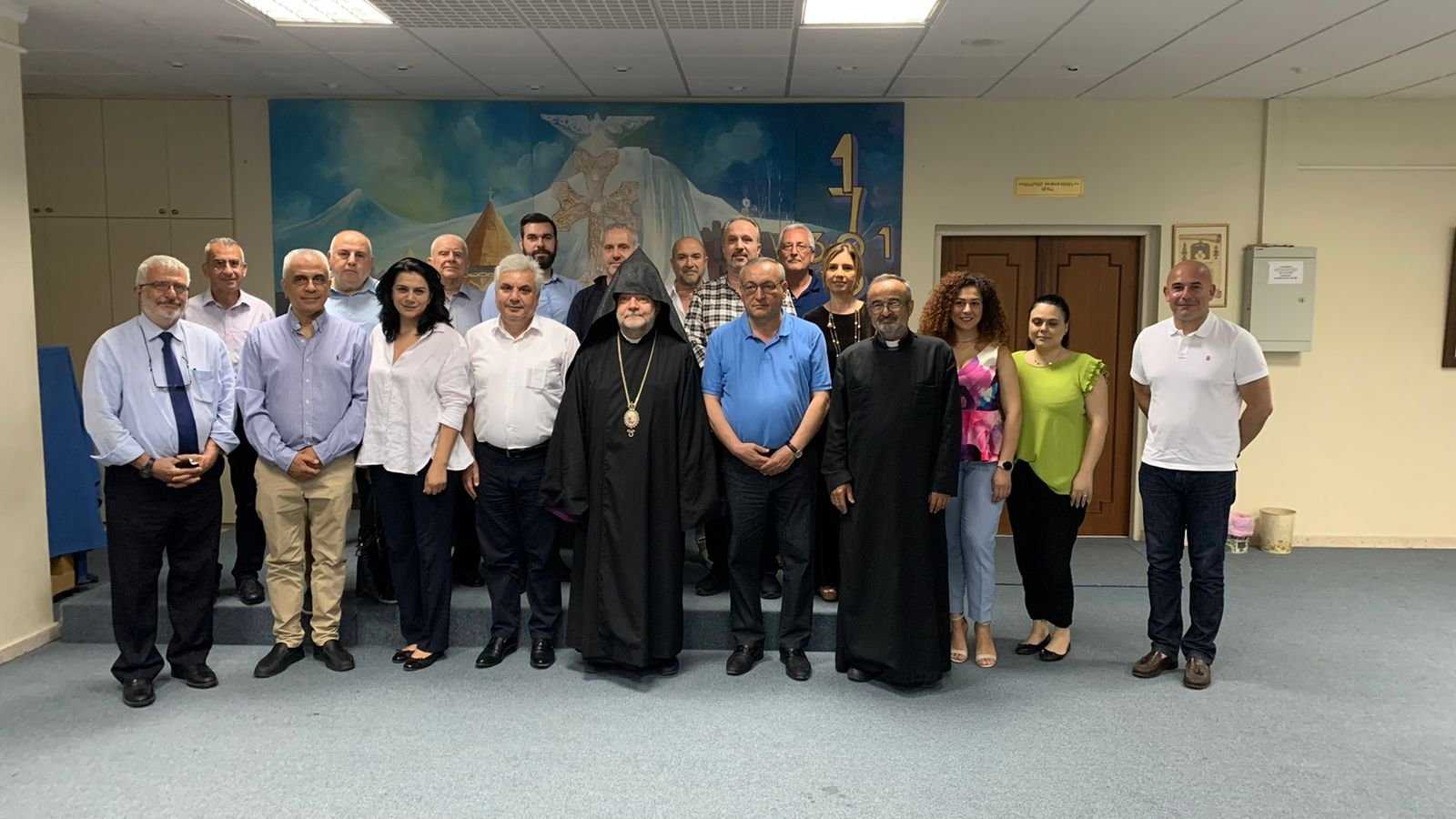
The Armenian Ethnarchy of Cyprus in the "Vahram Utidjian" Hall (2022)

The current charter of the prelature consists of 79 Articles and applies as of 3 September 2010. Administration is exercised by the Armenian Ethnarchy (Ազգային Իշխանութիւն) through the Diocesan Council (Թեմական Ժողով, since 2014 officially called Երեսփոխանական Ժողով), presided by the catholicosal vicar and consisting of two priests and twelve elected lay persons – seven for Nicosia, three for Larnaca, one for Limassol and one for Famagusta and the Administrative Council (Վարչական Ժողով, since 2014 officially called Ազգային Վարչութիւն), presided by the catholicosal vicar and consisting of seven lay persons appointed by the Diocesan Council. The Diocesan Council's chairman is Vahan Aynedjian (since 22 March 2022) and Hagop Kazandjian is the Administrative Council's chairman (as of 6 March 2025). As of 1998, the elected representative is ex officio a member of the Diocesan Council.

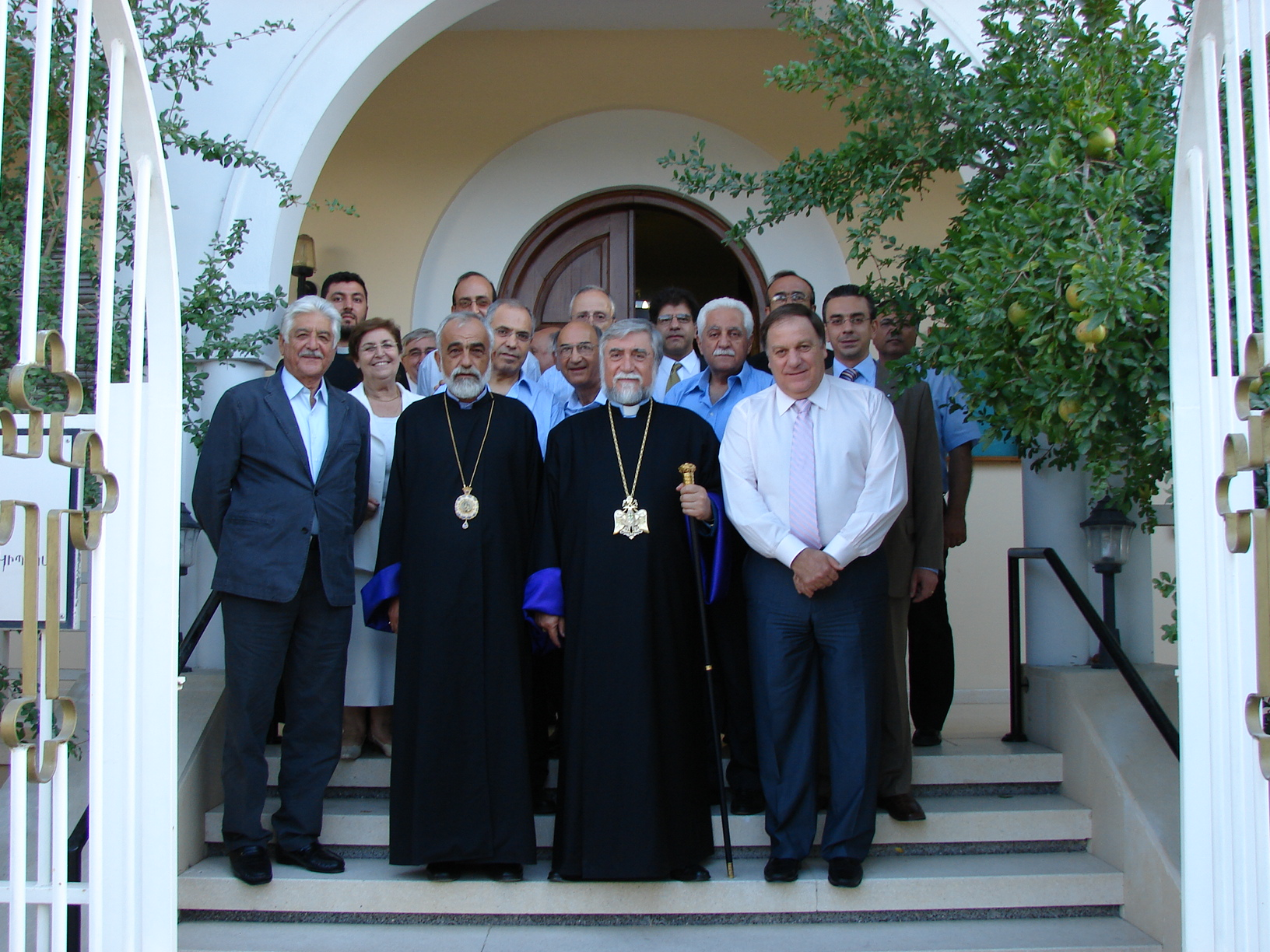
The Armenian Ethnarchy of Cyprus in front of the Prelature's building with Catholicos Aram I (2008)

According to the charter, the prelature also has a Religious Council (Կրօնական Ժողով) – consisting of the four clergymen – the local church committees (Եկեղեցւոյ Հոգաբարձութիւններ – one each for the Holy Mother of God cathedral in Nicosia, the Sourp Stepanos Church in Larnaca and the Sourp Kevork Church in Limassol) – and the local women's guilds (Եկեղեցւոյ Տիկնանց Մարմիններ), as well as the Board of Christian Education (Քրիստոնէական Դաստիարակութեան Խորհուրդ). Finally, there is the four-part Sourp Asdvadzadzin church choir (Սուրբ Աստուածածին Մայր Եկեղեցւոյ Երգչախումբ), established in 1921 by Vahan Bedelian.

According to the Decision of the Council of Ministers 66.589/19-12-2007, the Armenian Prelature of Cyprus receives an annual grant of €59,800 from the Republic of Cyprus. The republic also pays the salaries of the prelature's clergy and covers their medical and health care (Decision of the Council of Ministers 48.166/22-07-1998). The same arrangements apply for the Maronite Archbishopric of Cyprus and the Latin Vicariate of Cyprus.

== Places of worship ==
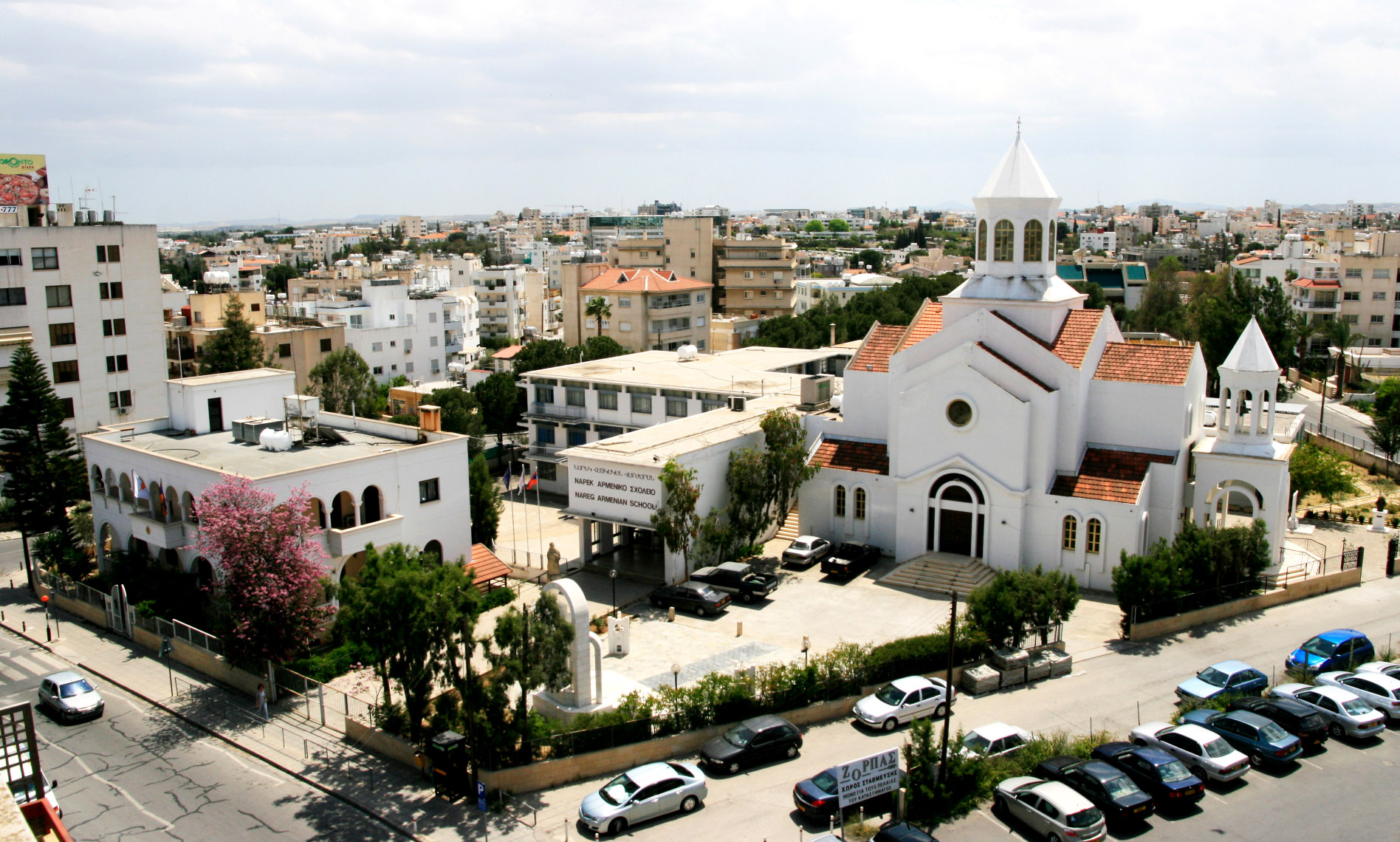
Holy Mother of God cathedral, Nicosia

The following churches and chapels belong to the prelature:

- Holy Mother of God Cathedral, Nicosia
- Sourp Stepanos Church, Larnaca
- Sourp Kevork Church, Limassol
- Three parish chapels in the vicinity of Nicosia
  - Sourp Boghos chapel, Nicosia
  - Sourp Haroutiun Chapel, Nicosia
  - Holy Saviour of All chapel, Nicosia

The following places of worship are located in the parts of Cyprus controlled by Northern Cyprus:

- Sourp Boghos chapel, Nicosia
- Sourp Magar Monastery, Halevga
- Ganchvor Monastery, Famagusta

Special permission needs to be obtained for liturgies to be held in Christian places of worship in Northern Cyprus.

== Cemeteries ==
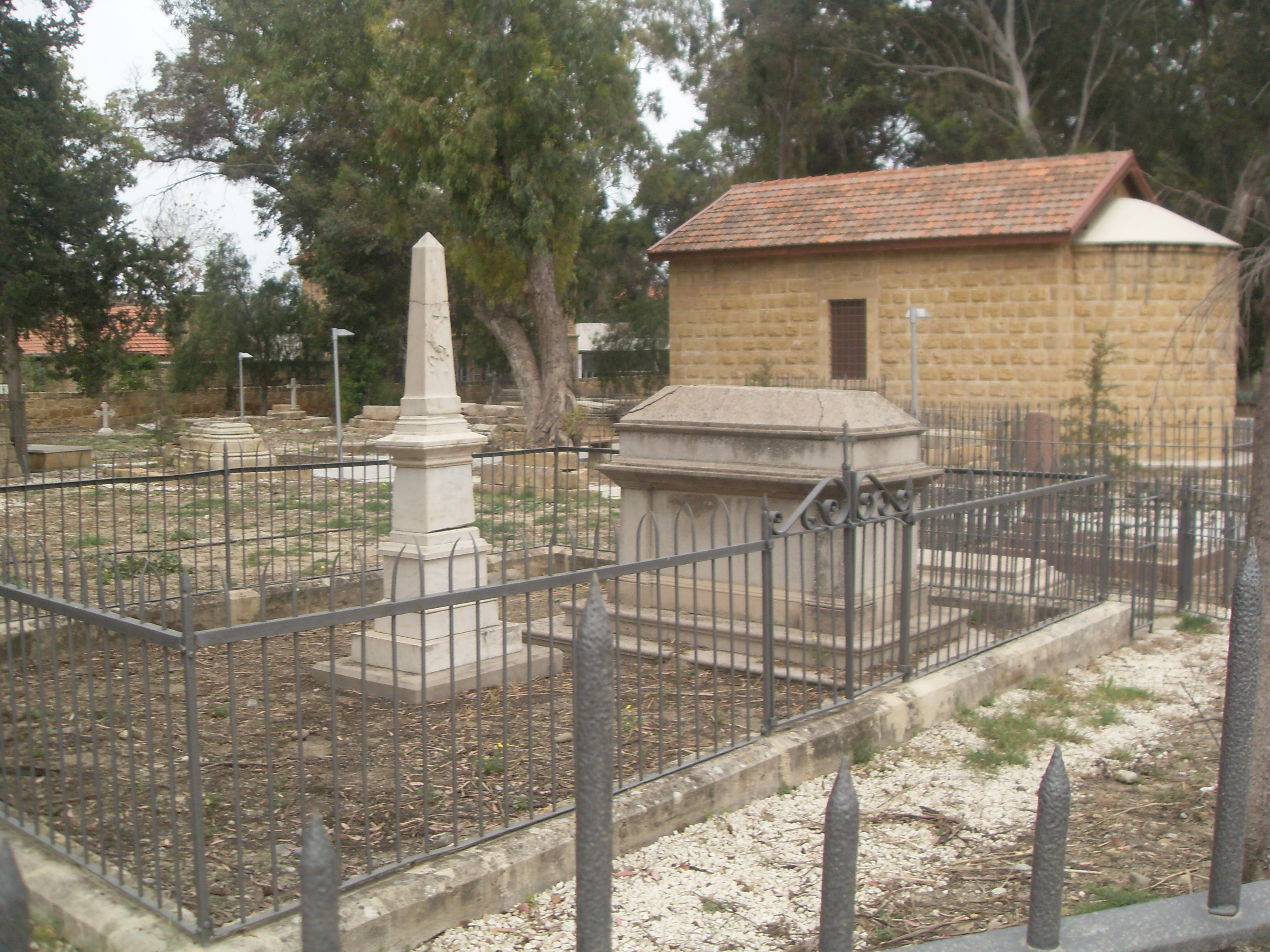
View of Nicosia's ancient Armenian cemetery

In Nicosia, there are three Armenian cemeteries:

- The ancient cemetery (established c. 1810 and used until 1931, in the vicinity of the Ledra Palace Hotel
- The old cemetery (established in 1931) in Ayios Dhometios
- The new cemetery (established in 1998) in the Anthoupolis-Kato Dheftera area

There is a commemorative aluminium plate in the ancient cemetery, on top of a cenotaph (2010), containing the names of 419 people which were recorded as buried there between 1877 and 1931.

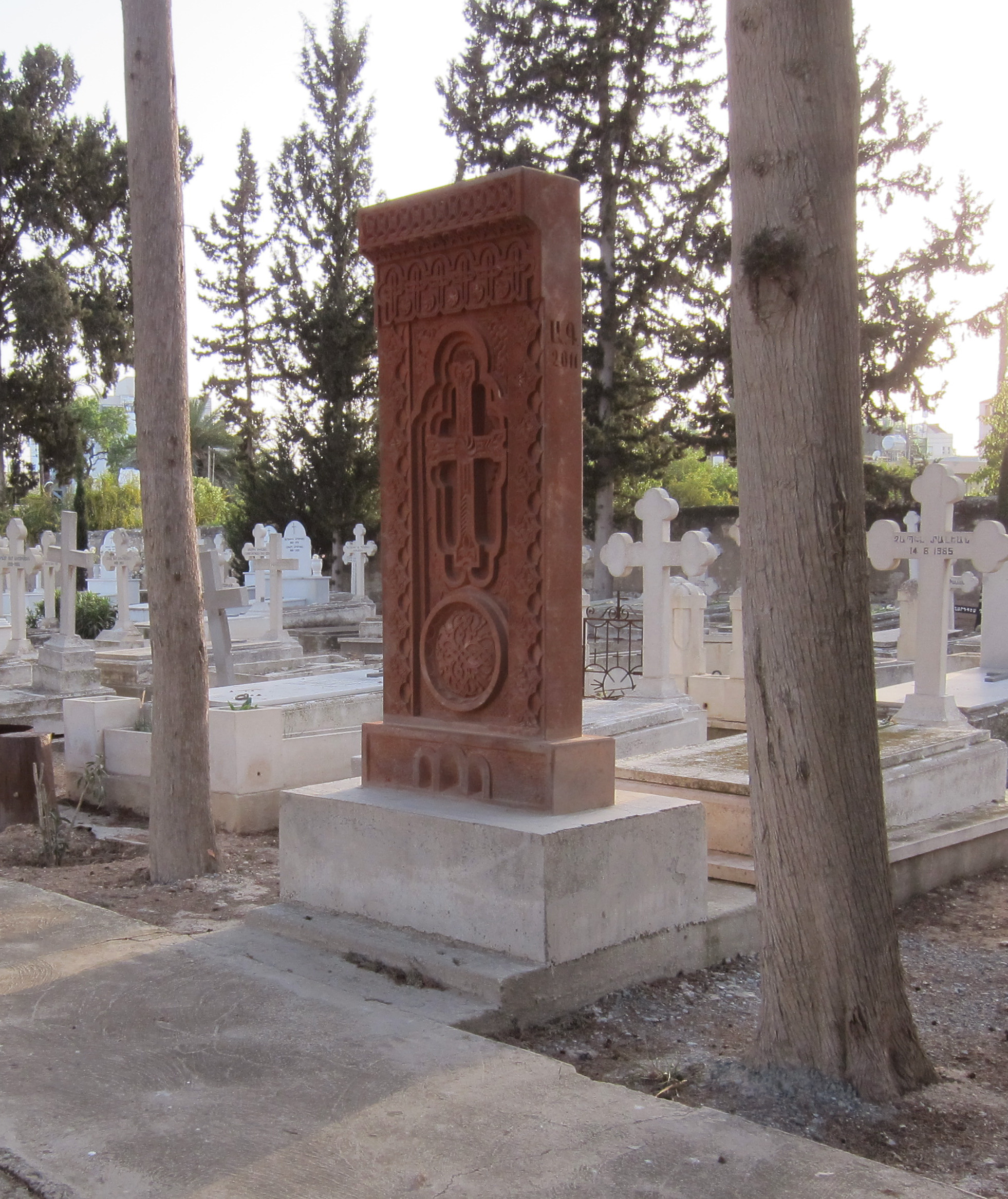
Larnaca Armenian cemetery's khachkar

There are two fountains in the old cemetery, one made of mortar (1952) and a granite one (2015). In the new cemetery, there is a grey tuff stone khachkar (cross-stone, 2012), placed there in 2013 in memory of all deceased Armenians; there is also a granite fountain (2000), with a shelter constructed over it (2010).

There is one Armenian cemetery in Larnaca (established in 1923) and one in Limassol (established in 1960). In the Larnaca cemetery, there is a reddish brown tuff stone khachkar (cross-stone, 2011), placed there in 2012 in memory of all deceased of the Armenian nation in Larnaca; there is also a marble fountain (2007). In the Limassol cemetery, there is a granite fountain (2001), with a shelter constructed over it (2006).

The Armenian cemetery (established 1967) in Northern Cyprus-controlled Famagusta, in the Ayios Memnon area, has been inaccessible since the 1974 Turkish invasion.

== Monuments ==
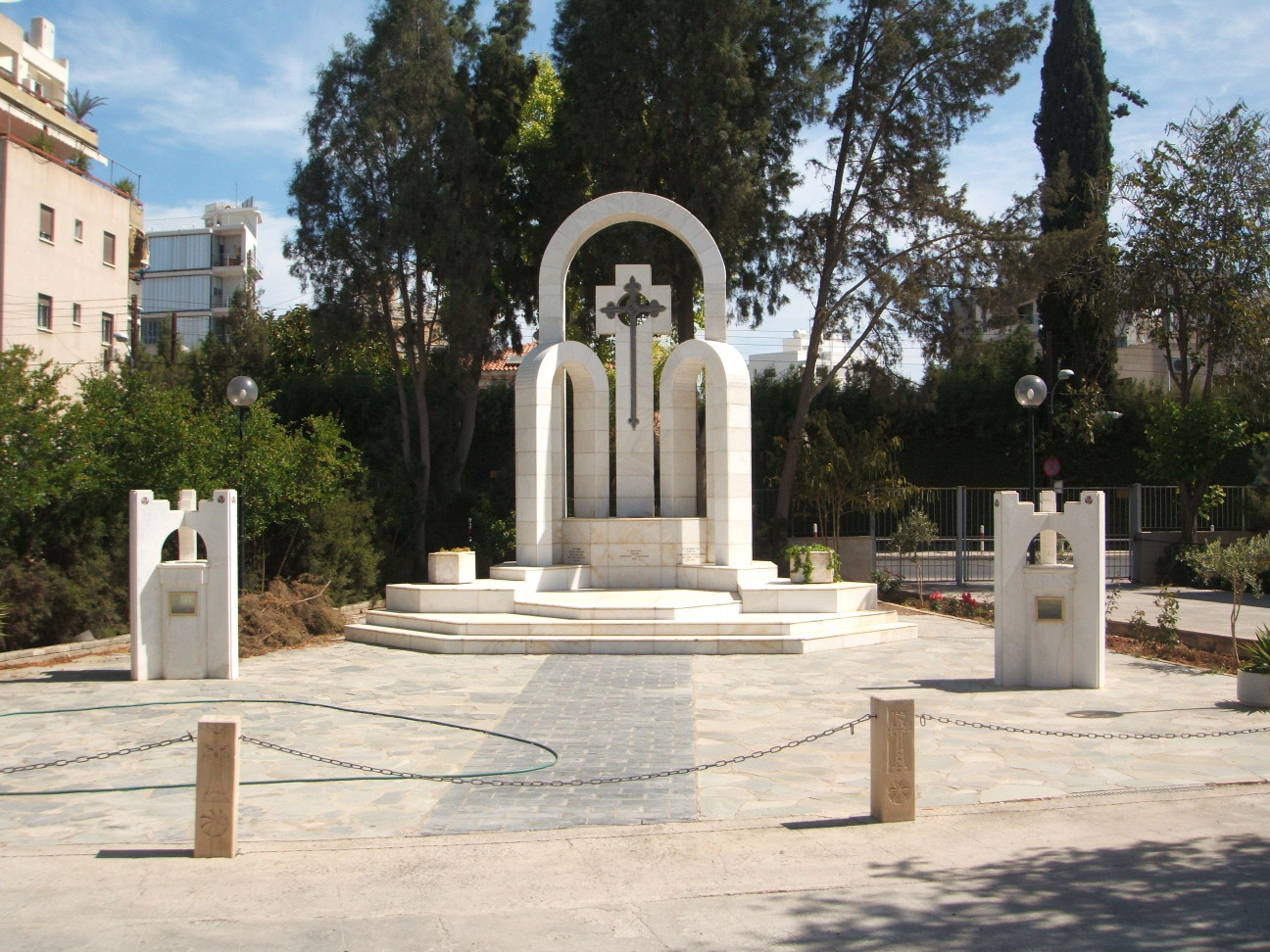
Nicosia's Armenian Genocide monument

The courtyard of the Holy Mother of God Cathedral in Nicosia, contains the following monuments:

- A white marble Armenian Genocide monument (1990–1991), with two marble ossuaries in front of it (2000);
- A white marble khachkar (cross-stone), a symbol of friendship of Armenians and Greeks of Cyprus (2001);
- A bronze bust of Archbishop Zareh Aznavorian (2004), placed there in 2005.

There is a reddish brown tuff stone khachkar (cross-stone, 2011) in the courtyard of Sourp Stepanos Church in Larnaca, dedicated to the 100th anniversary of the Adana massacre and the myriads of Armenian martyrs.

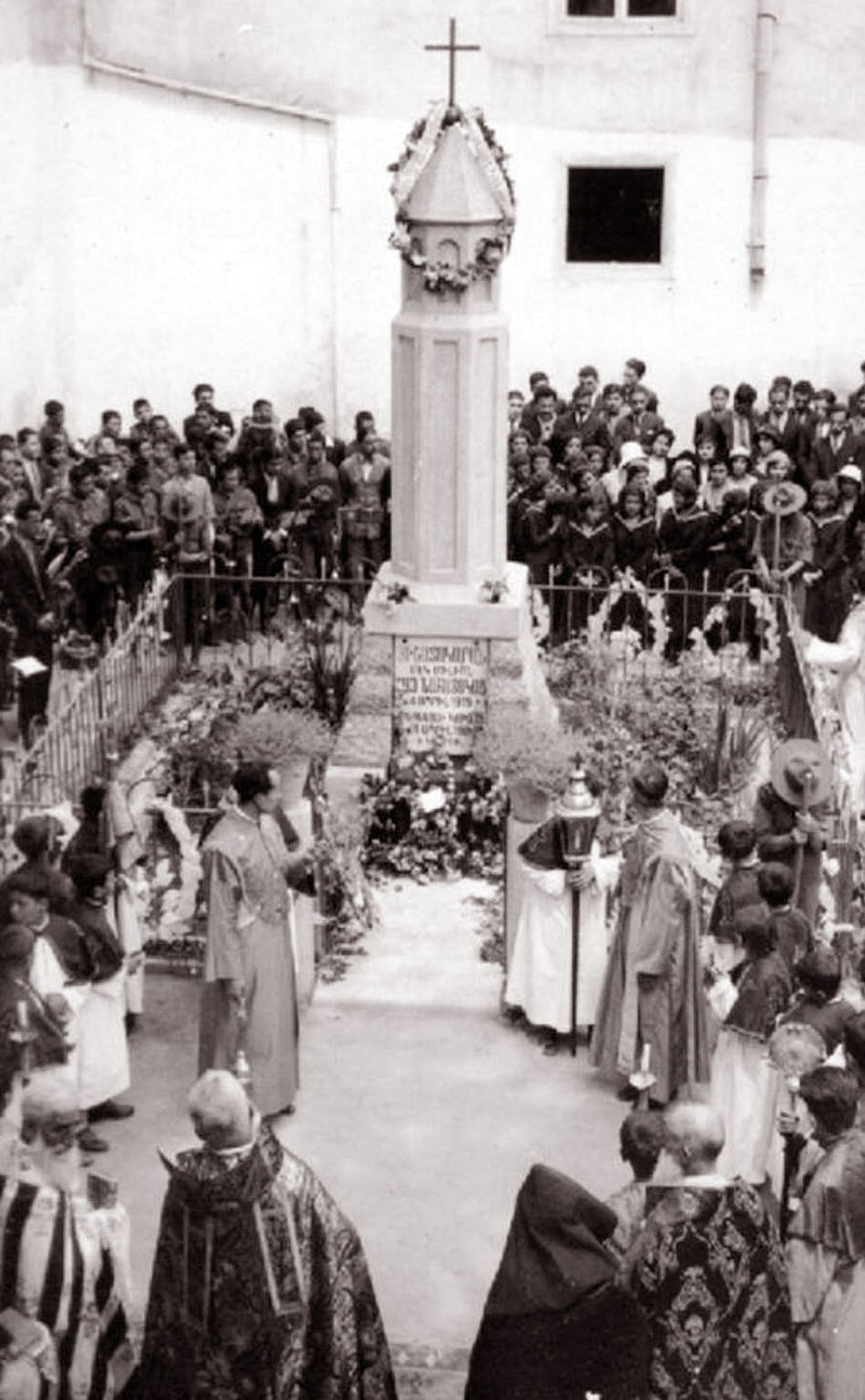
Nicosia's Armenian Genocide monument (1948)

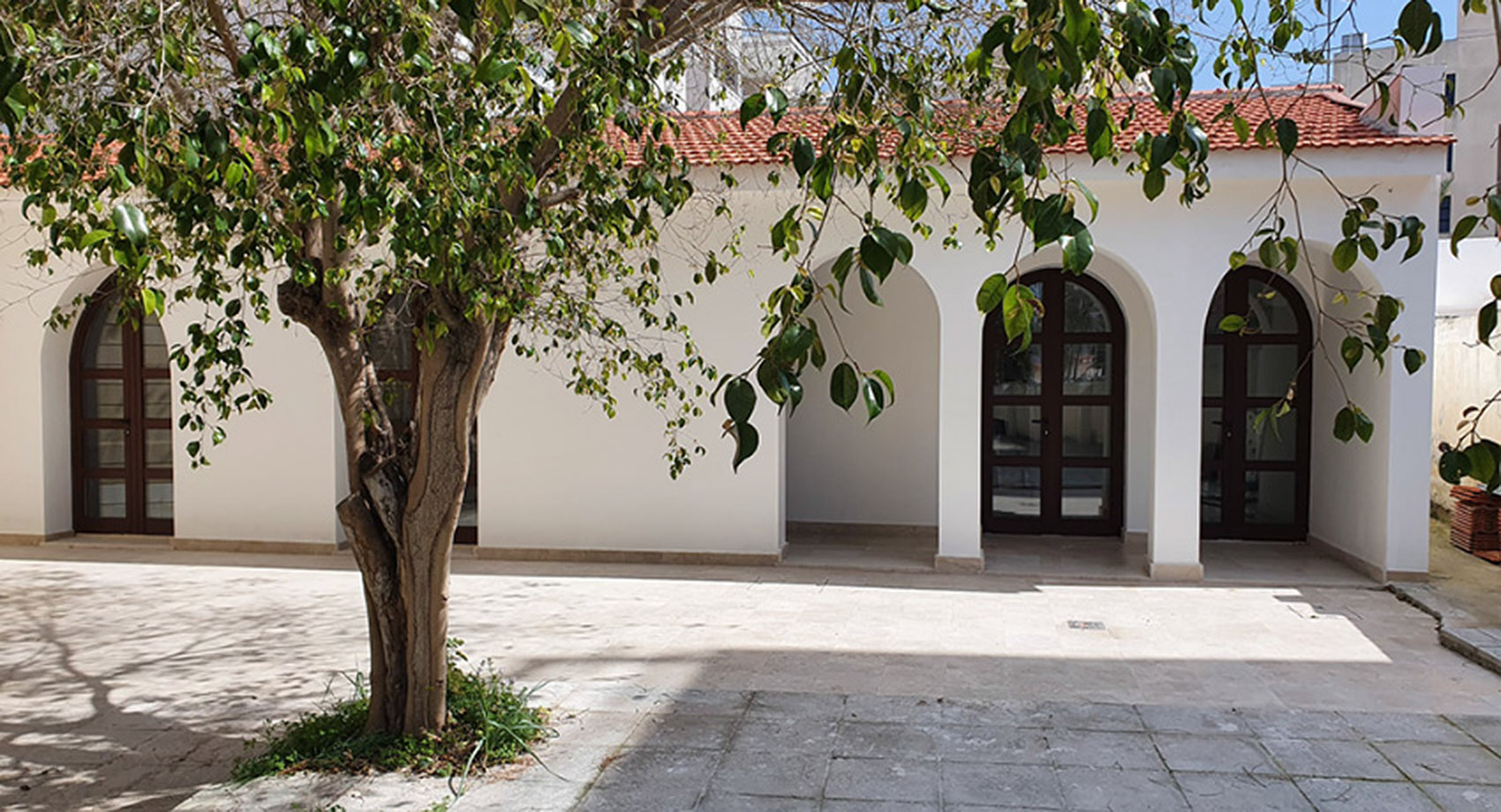
View of Limassol's Armenian church functions hall

There is a dark brown tuff stone khachkar (cross-stone, 2008) in the courtyard of Sourp Kevork Church in Limassol. To the east of the church there is the functions’ hall (2020–2022), which replaced a previous hall (1959).

There was once an Armenian genocide monument (1932) in the courtyard of Notre Dame de Tyre in North Nicosia. Only its base survives today, as the Turks have removed the obelisk that used to be on top of it.

There are two monuments in the vicinity of Sourp Magar Monastery in Halevga:

- A mortar obelisk, on top of Mekhitar's Hill, to the north-east of the monastery, dedicated to Abbot Mekhitar, his visit there in 1695 and the 200th anniversary of the formation of the Mekhitarist Order (1931, it replaced an older monument from 1901);
- A stone column, located at the monastery's square to the west of the monastery, dedicated to the visit of Catholicos Sahag II there and the opening of the square in 1933.

== List of prelates, catholicosal vicars and locum tenentes ==
Year	Prelate	Year	Prelate	Year	Prelate	Year	Prelate	Year	Prelate
...1179...	Bishop Tateos	1715–1735	Archimandrite Haroutiun	...1844...	Archimandrite Tateos	1884	Friar Hovhannes Papazian	1959	Bishop Hrant Khachadourian
...1307...	Bishop Nigoghaos	1734–1735	Archimandrite Haroutiun	1846–1848	Archbishop Hovhannes Marashtsi	1885–1889	Friar Hovhannes Shahinian	1960–1968	Senior Archimandrite Yervant Apelian
...1340...	Bishop Krikor	...1736...	Archimandrite Mardiros Sisetsi	1848	Bishop Hovhannes Yetessian	1889–1896	Archimandrite Khoren Portoukalian	1968–1973	Senior Archimandrite Arsen Avedikian
1421–1425	Bishop Levon	1744–1745	Bishop Tavit	1854	Bishop Hovhannes Mamigonian	1896–1897	Friar Ghevont Der Nahabedian	1973–1974	archpriest Vazken Sandrouni
1446–1467	Bishop Sarkis	1751–1753	Archimandrite Hovsep	1856	Bishop Apraham Bulbul	1897–1899	Friar Hovhannes Shahinian	1974–1977	Bishop Nerses Pakhdigian
1504–1515	Bishop Tavit	1773–1774	Senior Archimandrite Krikor Basmadjian	1857–1859	Archimandrite Boghos Vanetsi	1899–1905	Archimandrite Bedros Saradjian	1977–1983	Bishop Zareh Aznavorian
1553–1567	Bishop Ghougas	...–1779	Bishop Mardiros	1859–1861	Archimandrite Atanas Izmirtsi	1906–1907	Archimandrite Yeremia Liforian	1983–1997	Senior Archimandrite Yeghishe Mandjikian
1567...	Bishop Hovhannes	1783–1799	Bishop Hagop	1864–1865	Archimandrite Tateos Yeretsian	1907–1910	Friar Hovhannes Shahinian	1997–2014	Archbishop Varoujan Hergelian
1581	Hieromonk Stepanos	1799–1812	Archbishop Hovhannes	1865–1869	Archimandrite Ghougas Khanigian	1910–1912	Friar Ghevont Der Nahabedian	2014–2016	Archbishop Nareg Alemezian
...1618...	Monk Vartan	1812–1814	Archimandrite Bedros	1870–1872	Archimandrite Vartan Mamigonian	1912–1917	Friar Sahag Minassian	2016–2017	Friar Mashdots Ashkarian
...1642...	Archimandrite Mesrob	1814–1816	Archimandrite Stepanos	1872–1873	Archimandrite Movses Geomrukdjian	1918–1919	Senior Archimandrite Yervant Perdahdjian	2017–2024	Archbishop Khoren Toghramadjian
1644	Bishop Tavit Areveltsi	1816–1817	Archimandrite Teotoros	1873–1874	Archimandrite Maghakia Derounian	1920	Archbishop Taniel Hagopian	2024–present	Archbishop Gomidas Ohanian
...1665...	Friar Sahag	1817–1819	Bishop Tionesios Garabedian	1874–1876	Archimandrite Mesrob Ghaltakhdjian	1920–1940	Archbishop Bedros Saradjian		
...1668...	Bishop Hovhannes	1821	Archimandrite Stepanos	1876–1877	Archimandrite Garabed Pakradouni	1936–1940	Archimandrite Barouyr Minassian		
...1670...	Bishop Melidon	1822–1827	Archimandrite Kapriel	1878–1880	archpriest Hovhannes Hunkiarbeyendian	1940–1946	archpriest Khoren Kouligian		
1675–1695	Archimandrite Sarkis Cholakh	1827–1833	Archimandrite Haroutiun Izmirtsi	1880–1881	Archimandrite Zakaria Yeghissian	1946–1956	Archbishop Ghevont Chebeyan		
1704–1705	Archimandrite Minas Amtetsi	1837–1843	Bishop Hovhannes	1881–1883	Archimandrite Movses Geomrukdjian	1956–1960	archpriest Khoren Kouligian		

== List of parish priests and spiritual shepherds ==
According to available records, the following clergymen served as resident parish priests and spiritual shepherds:

Nicosia: Friar Bedros Vartanian (1874–1882), Friar Hovhannes Shahinian (1877–1922), Friar Yeghia Pekmezian (1877–1880), Friar Hovhannes Shahanian (1881–1889), Friar Ghevont Der Nahabedian (1896–1913), Friar Sahag Minassian (1912–1916), Friar Arsen Yemenidjian (1922–1926), Archimandrite Krikor Bahlavouni (Topal Vartabed) (1922–1948), Friar Haroutiun Toumayan (1922–1929), Friar Hagop Nazarian (1926–1931), Friar Ohannes Der Megerditchian (1930–1942), Friar Benjamin Vanerian (1931–1942), Friar Vahan Jelajian (1936)*, archpriest Khoren Kouligian (1938–1966), Friar Shahe Semerdjian (1949–1951)*, Friar Krikor Bedrossian (1951–1954), Friar Arsen Hagopian (1951–1955)*, archpriest Vazken Sandrouni (1956–2000)*, archpriest Momik Habeshian (2000–present)*.

Larnaca: Friar Vahan Bulbulian (1912–1913), Friar Mesrob Keoshgerian (1919–1920 & 1921–1924), Archimandrite Krikor Bahlavouni (Topal Vartabed) (1920–1922), Friar Arsen Yemenidjian (1921–1922), Friar Khoren Kouyoumdjian (1921–1922), Bishop Yeghishe Garoyan (1921–1929), Friar Mesrob Demirdjian (1921–1924), Friar Yeznig Ashdjian (1921–1925), Friar Kevork Kalaydjian (1923–1928), Friar Ohannes Der Megerditchian (1928–1929), Friar Krikor Bedrossian (1929–1951), Friar Vartan Avakian (1951–1957)*, Friar Smpad Der Mekhsian (1957–1962), Friar Sahag Andekian (1963–1967), Friar Ashod Gotchian (1966–1968), Friar Magar Nadjarian (1969–1970), archpriest Parsegh Khatcherian (1971–1984), Friar Nareg Pehlivanian (1986–1990)*, archpriest Mashdots Ashkarian (1992–present).

Limassol: Archimandrite Varoujan Hergelian (1970–1974), Senior Archimandrite Hovhannes Saghdedjian (2024–present).

(*) ordained in Cyprus.

Prior to 1974, priests from Nicosia would visit Famagusta and hold liturgies there. With regard to Limassol, prior to 1970 priests from Nicosia would celebrate liturgies, whereas between 1974 and 2024 the Larnaca parish priest was also Limassol's parish priest.

== Gallery ==
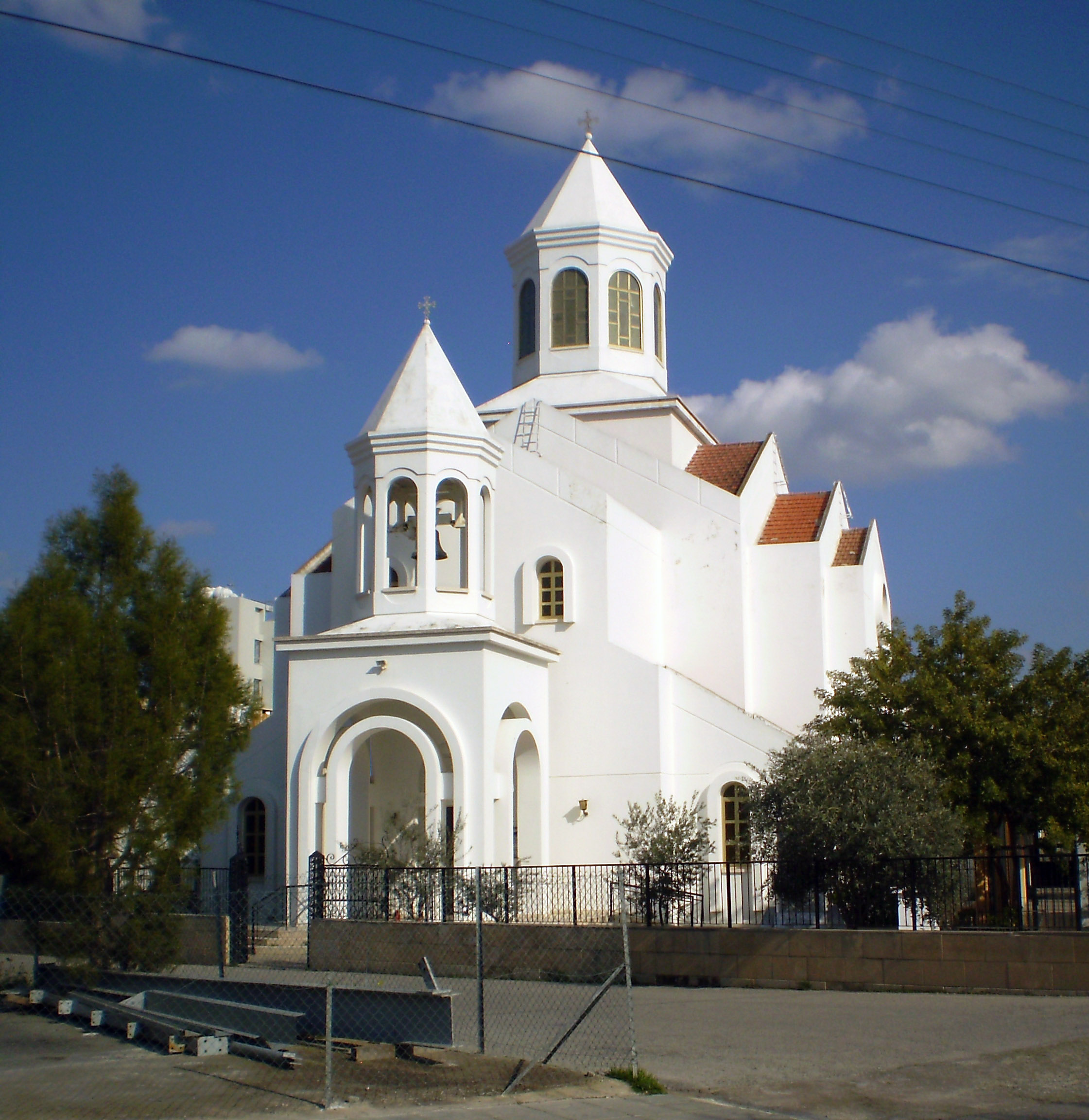
Sourp Asdvadzadzin cathedral in Acropolis, Nicosia

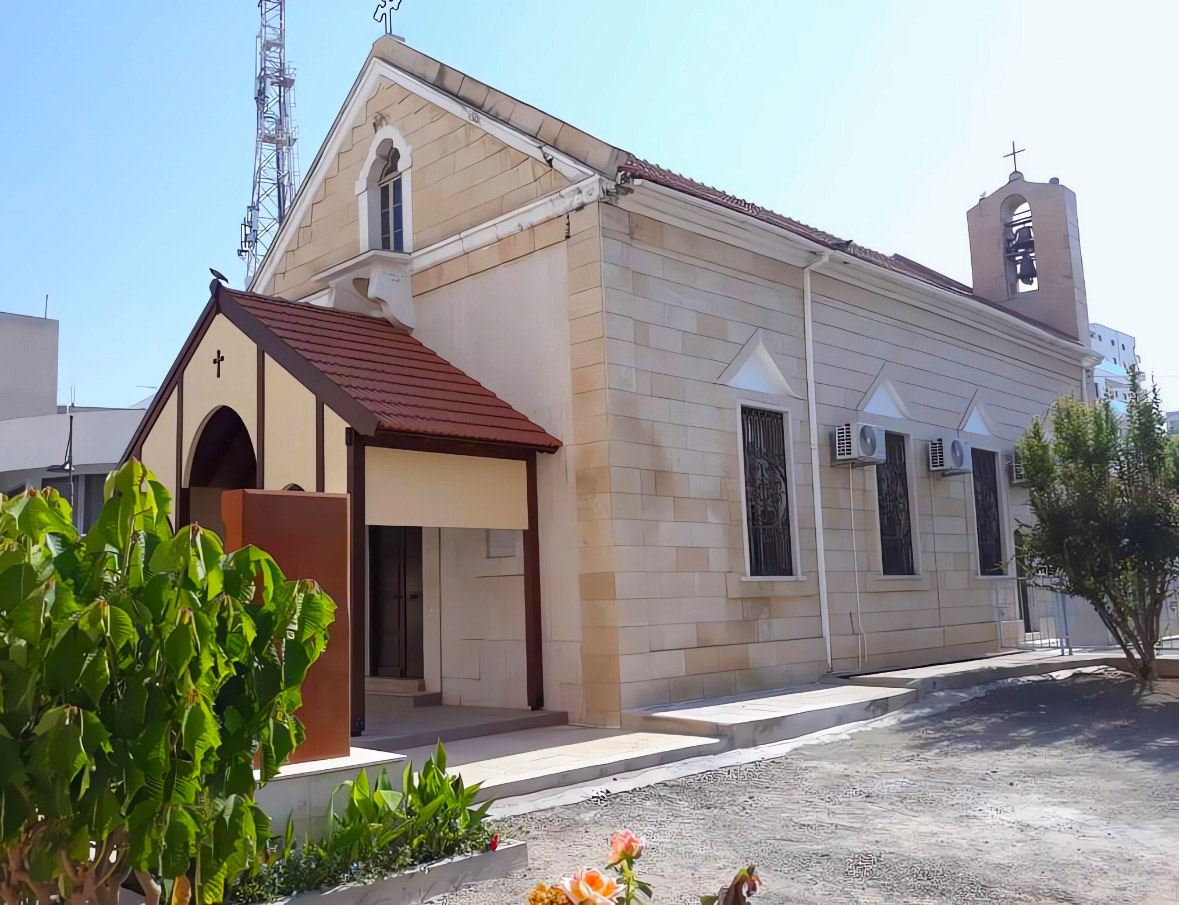
Sourp Stepanos church in Larnaca

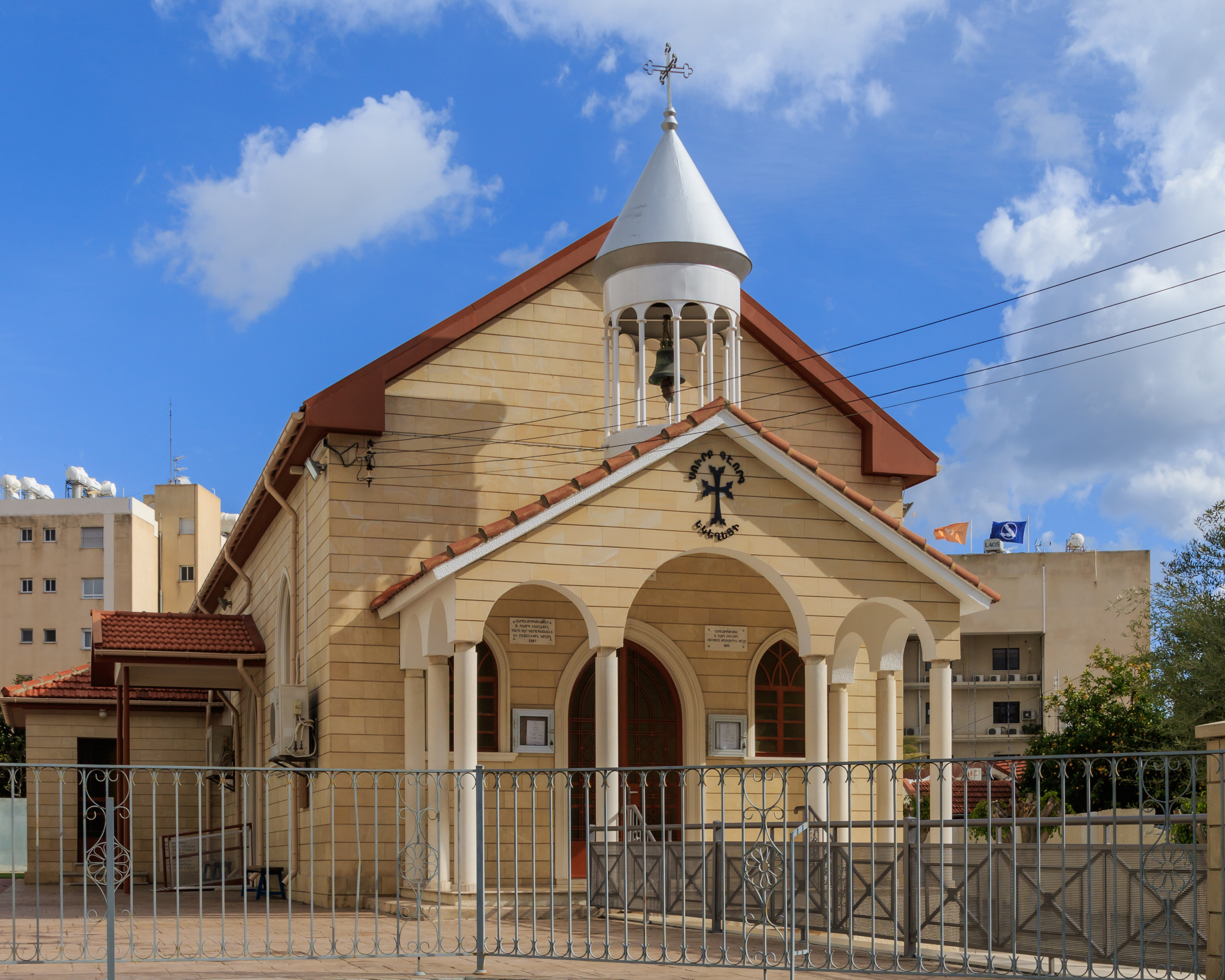
Sourp Kevork church in Limassol

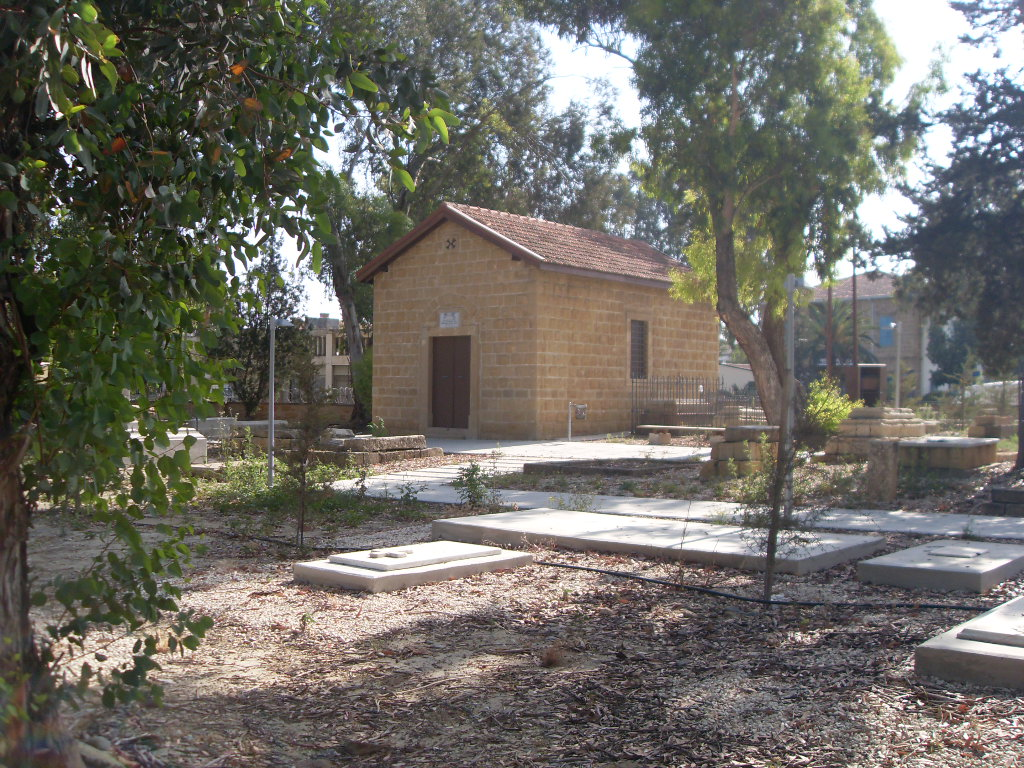
Sourp Boghos chapel in Nicosia

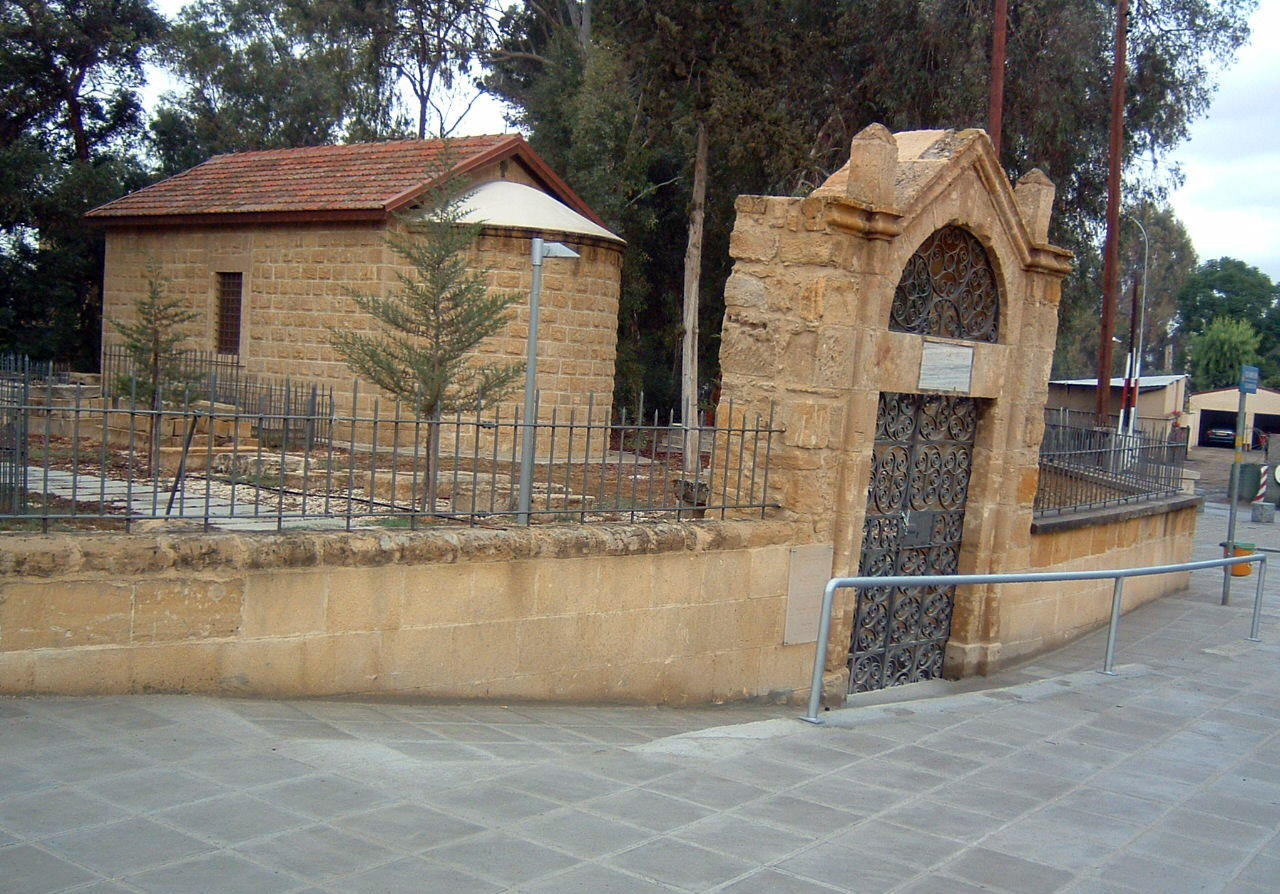
The entrance gate to Nicosia's ancient Armenian cemetery

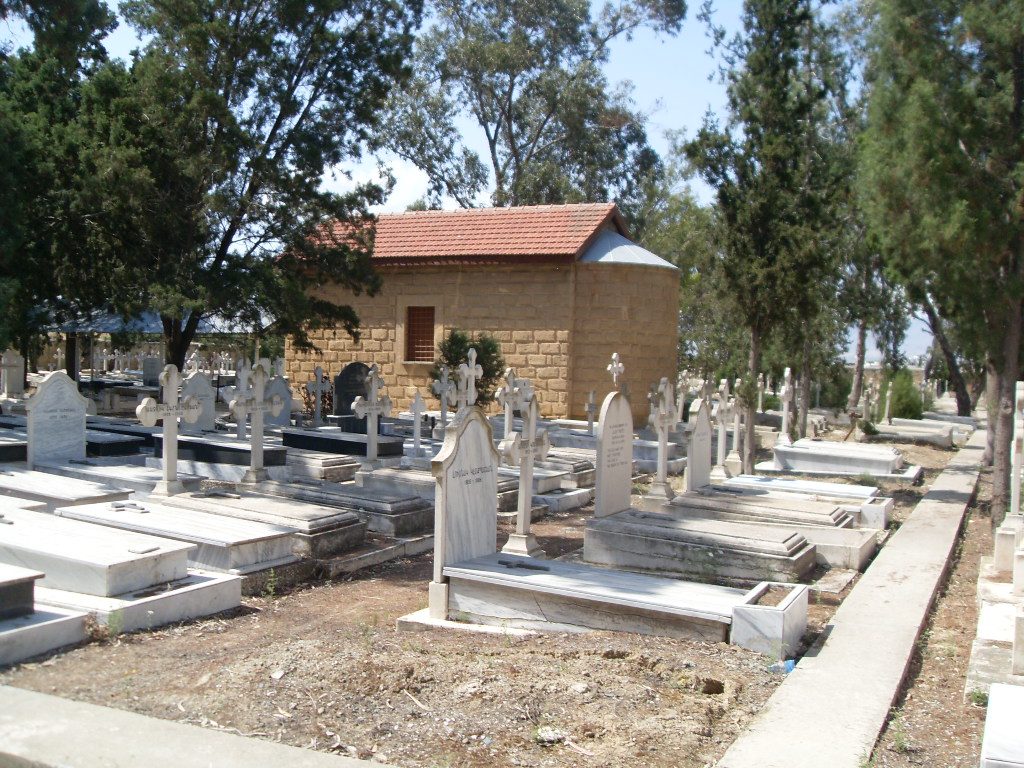
Sourp Haroutiun chapel in Ayios Dhometios, Nicosia

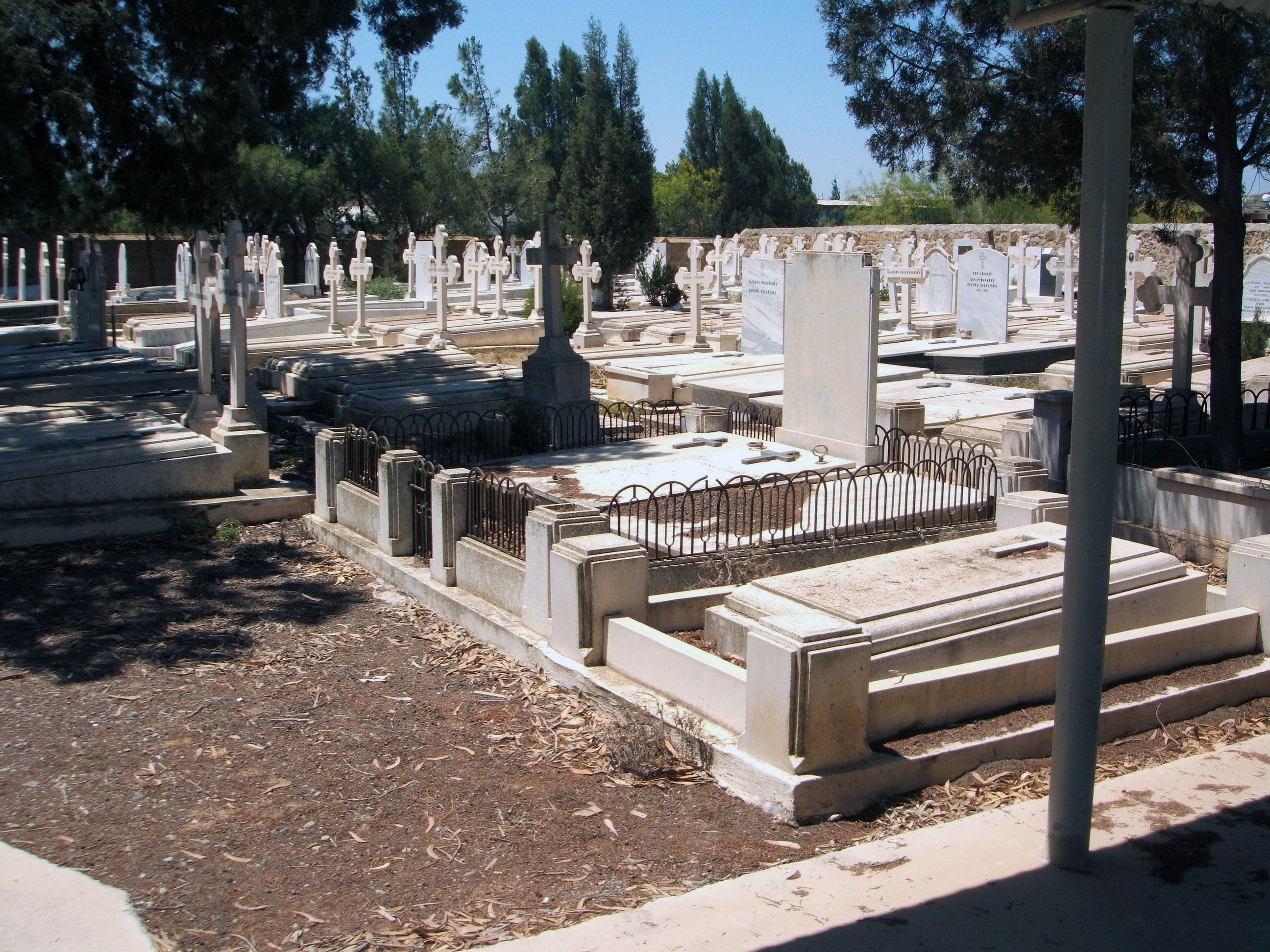
View of Nicosia's second Armenian cemetery

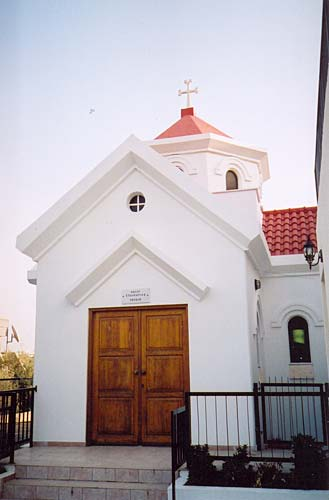
Holy Saviour of All chapel in Acropolis, Nicosia

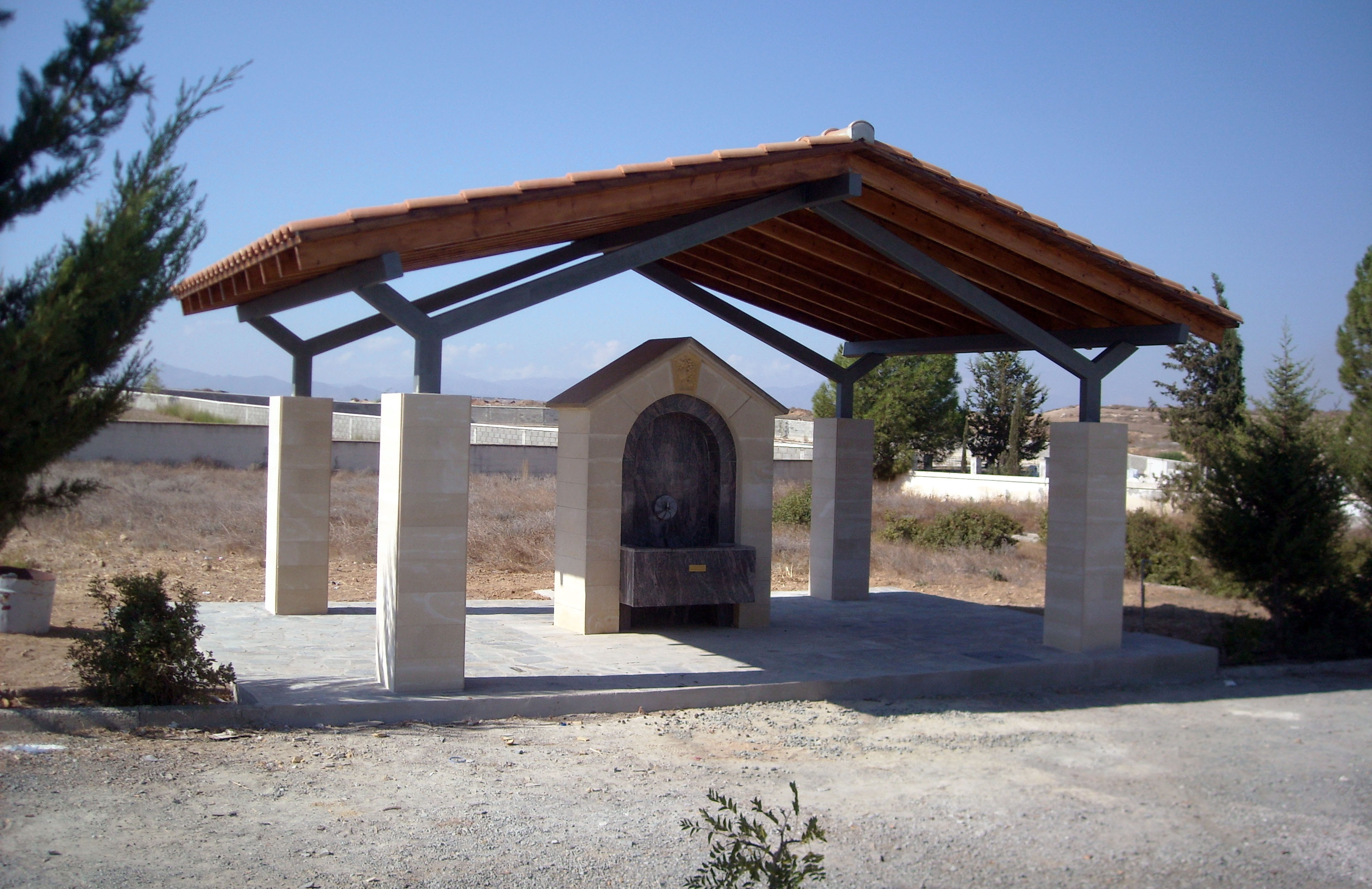
Shelter at Nicosia's new Armenian cemetery

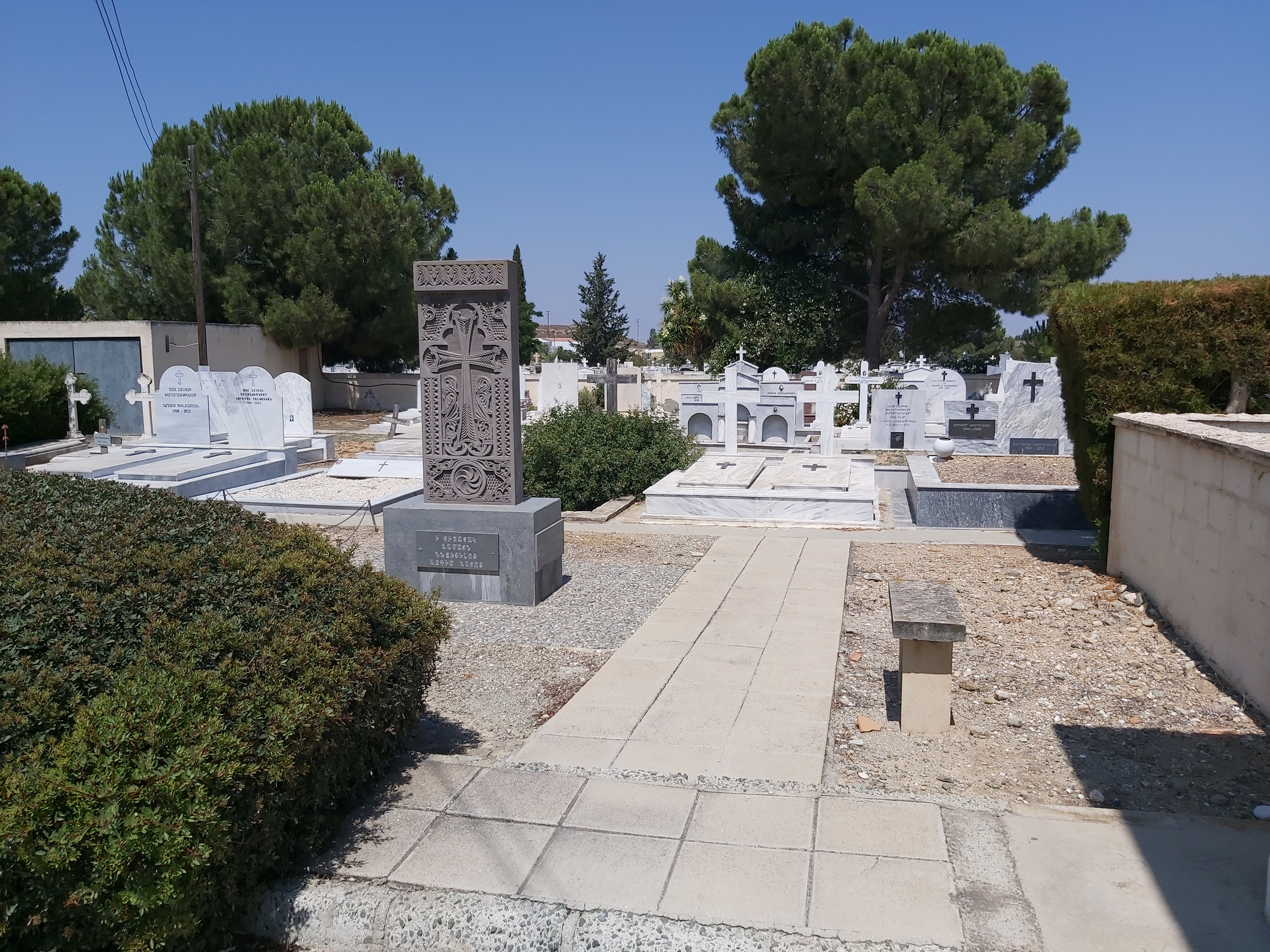
View of Nicosia's new Armenian cemetery

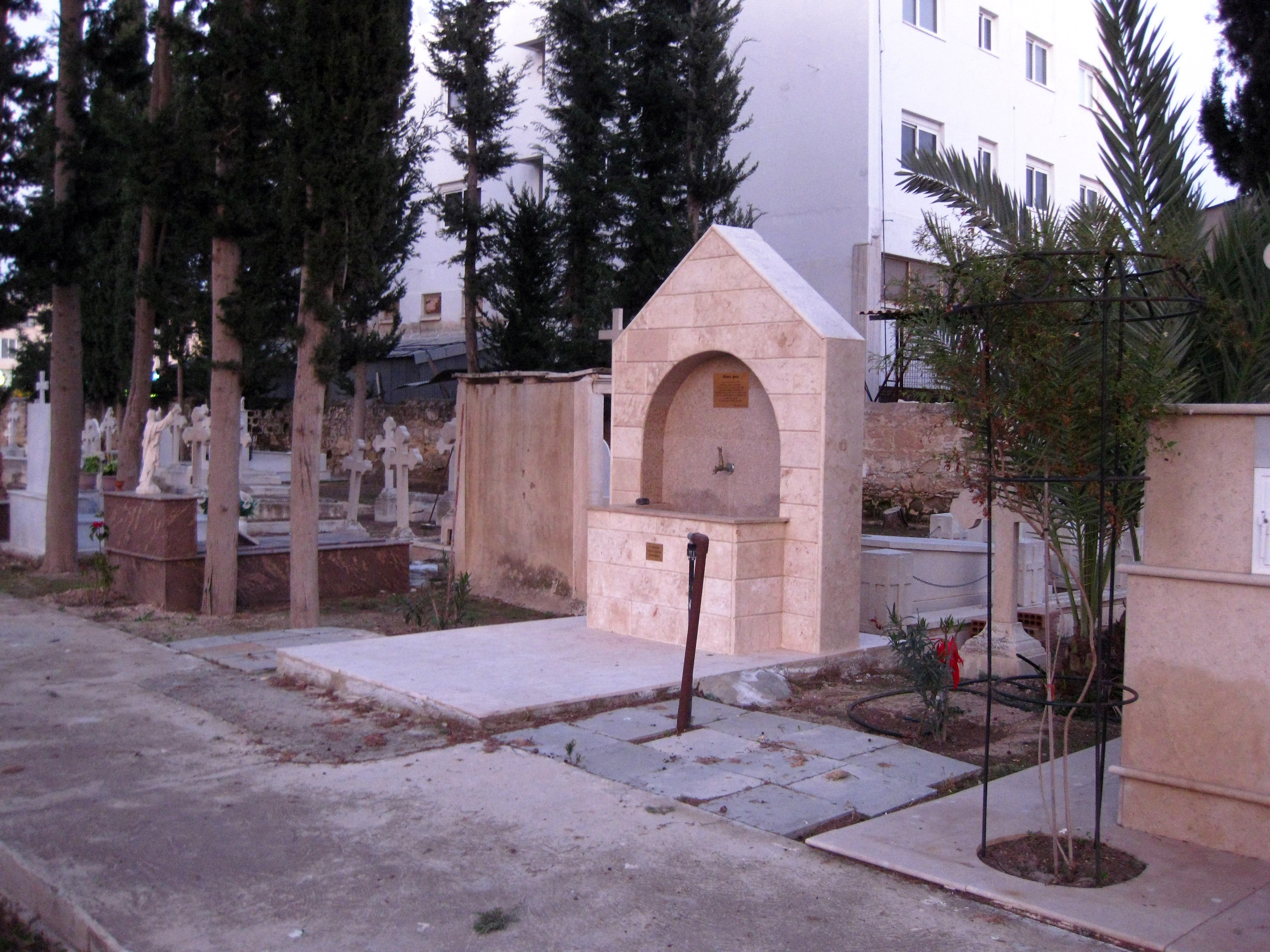
View of Larnaca's Armenian cemetery

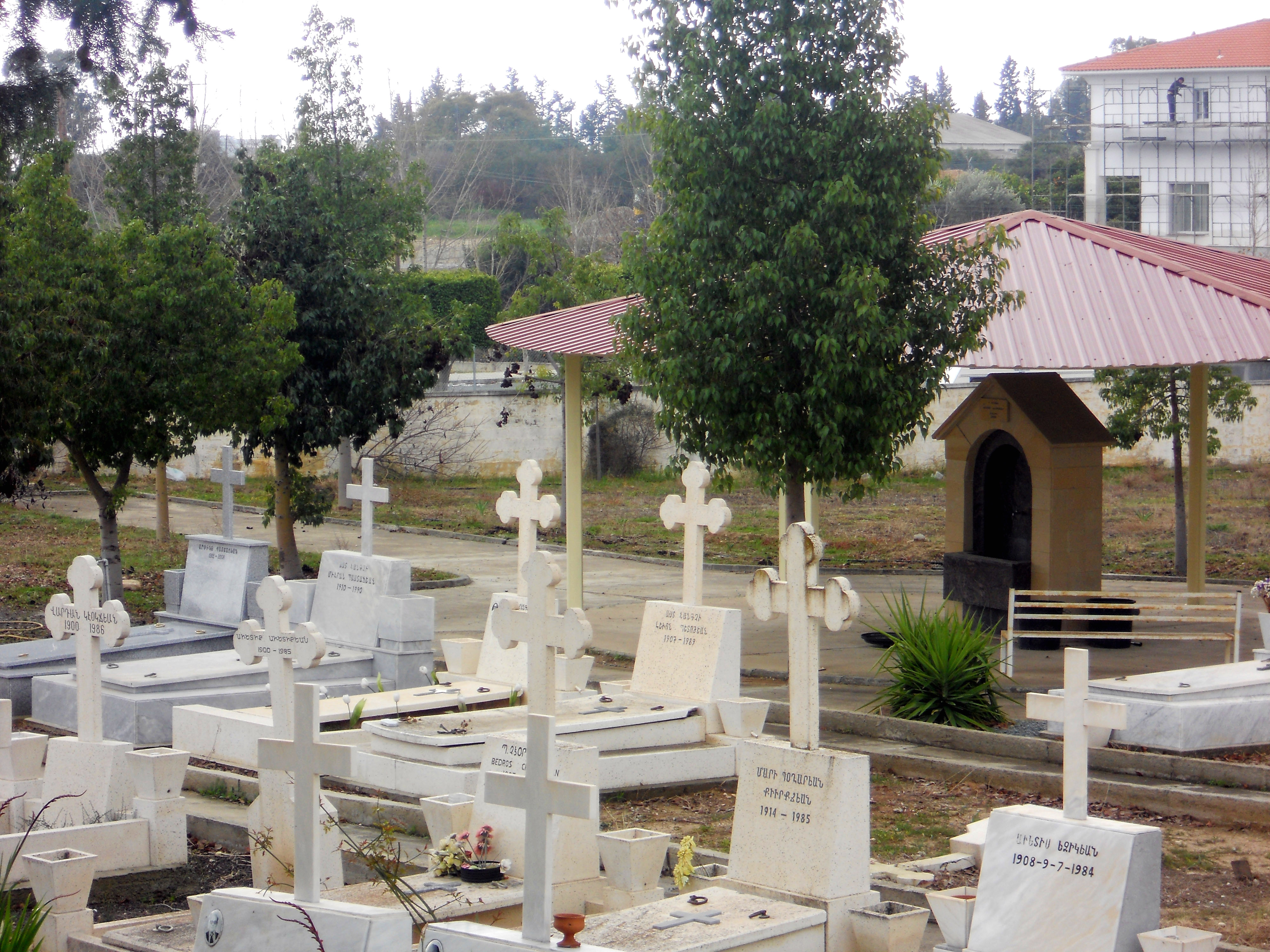
View of Limassol's Armenian cemetery

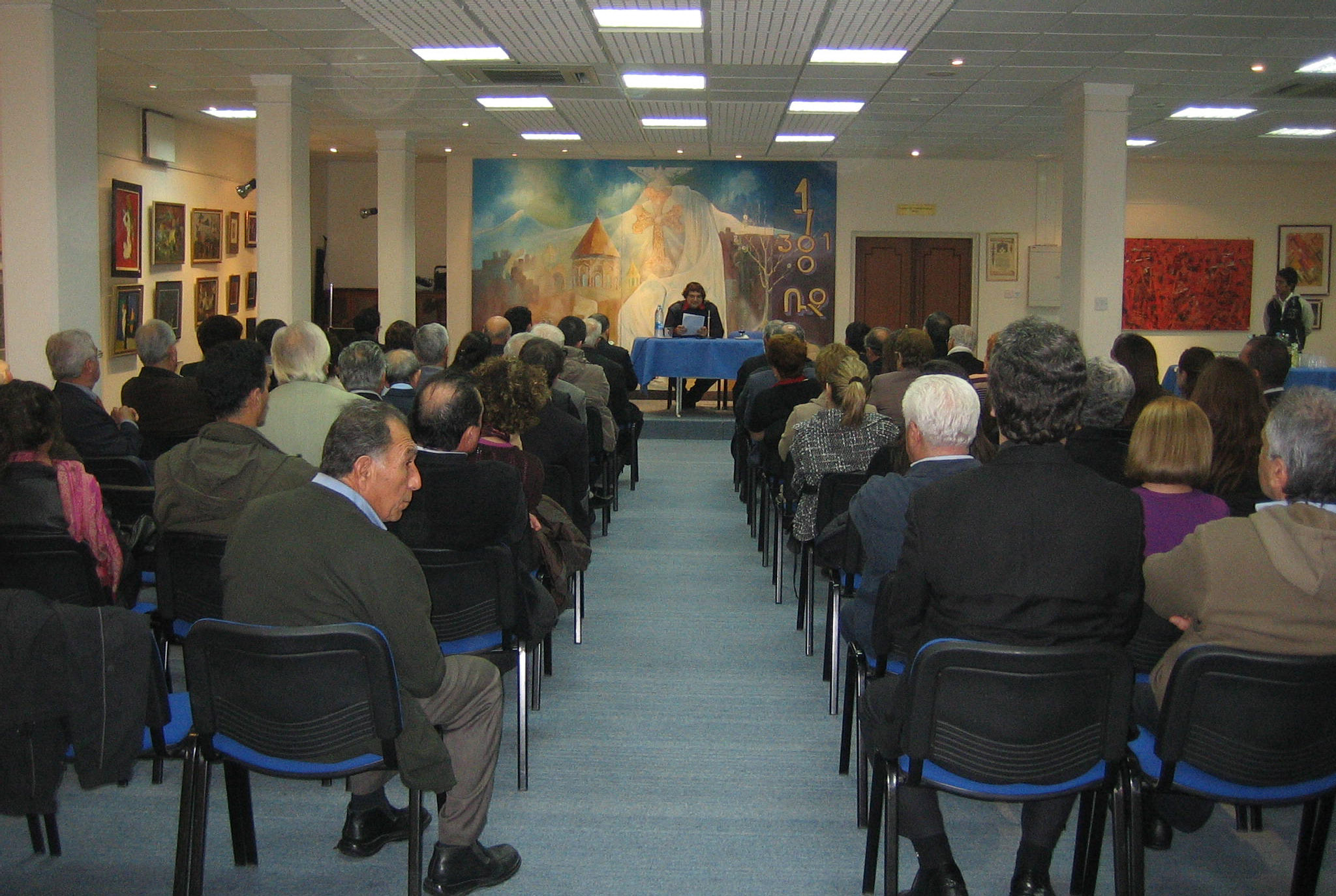
The "Vahram Utidjian" Hall of the Prelature, Nicosia

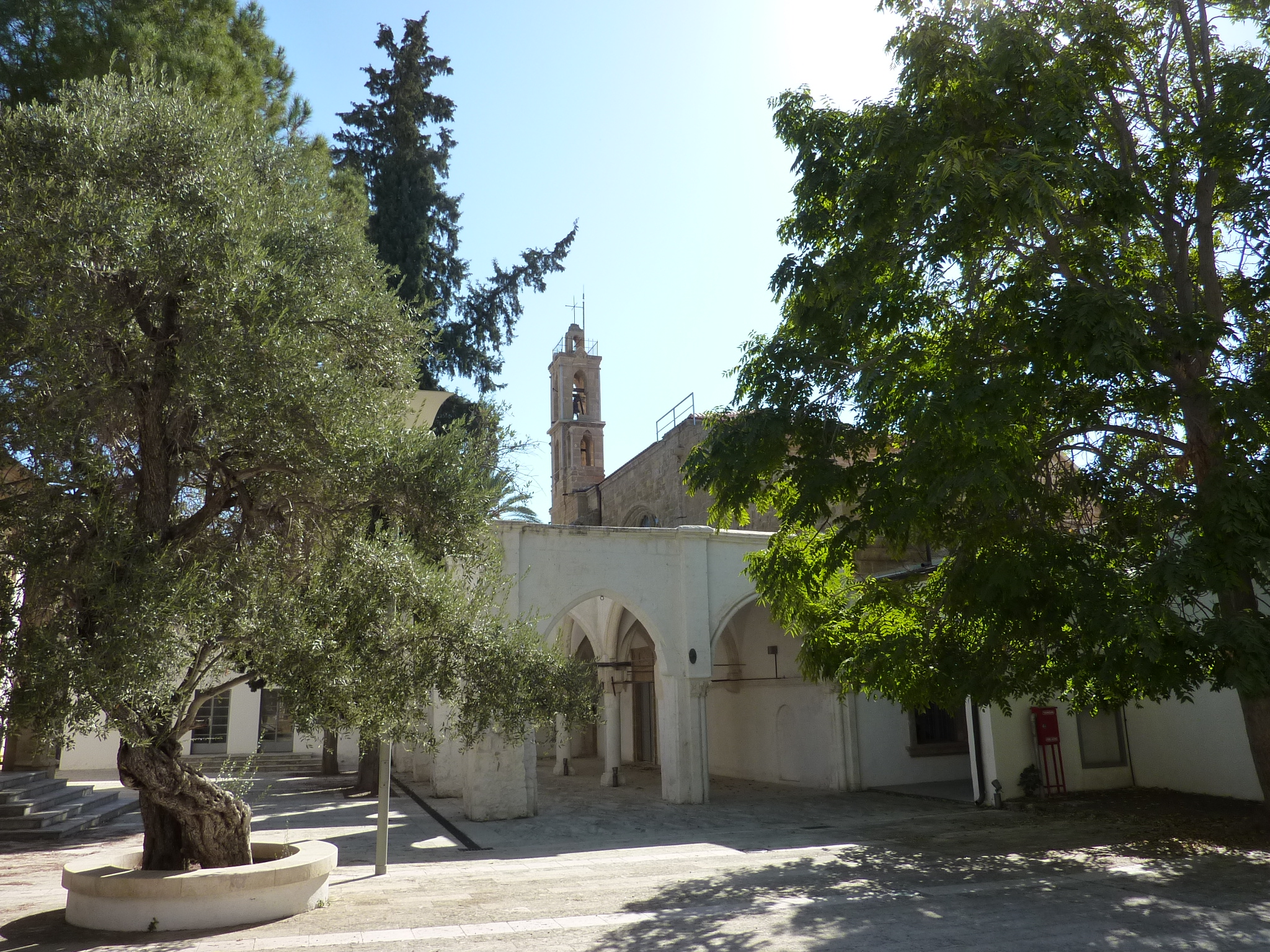
Old Sourp Asdvadzadzin cathedral in occupied Nicosia

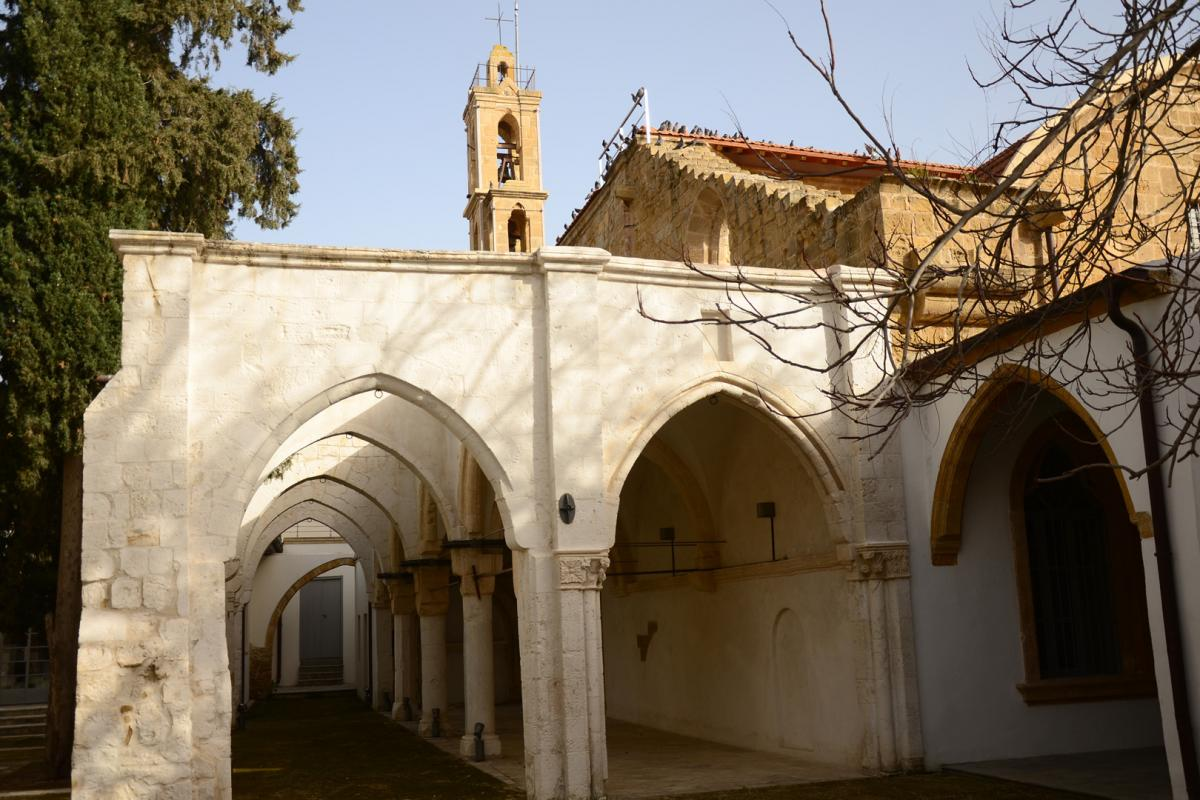
Entrance to the old Sourp Asdvadzadzin cathedral in North Nicosia

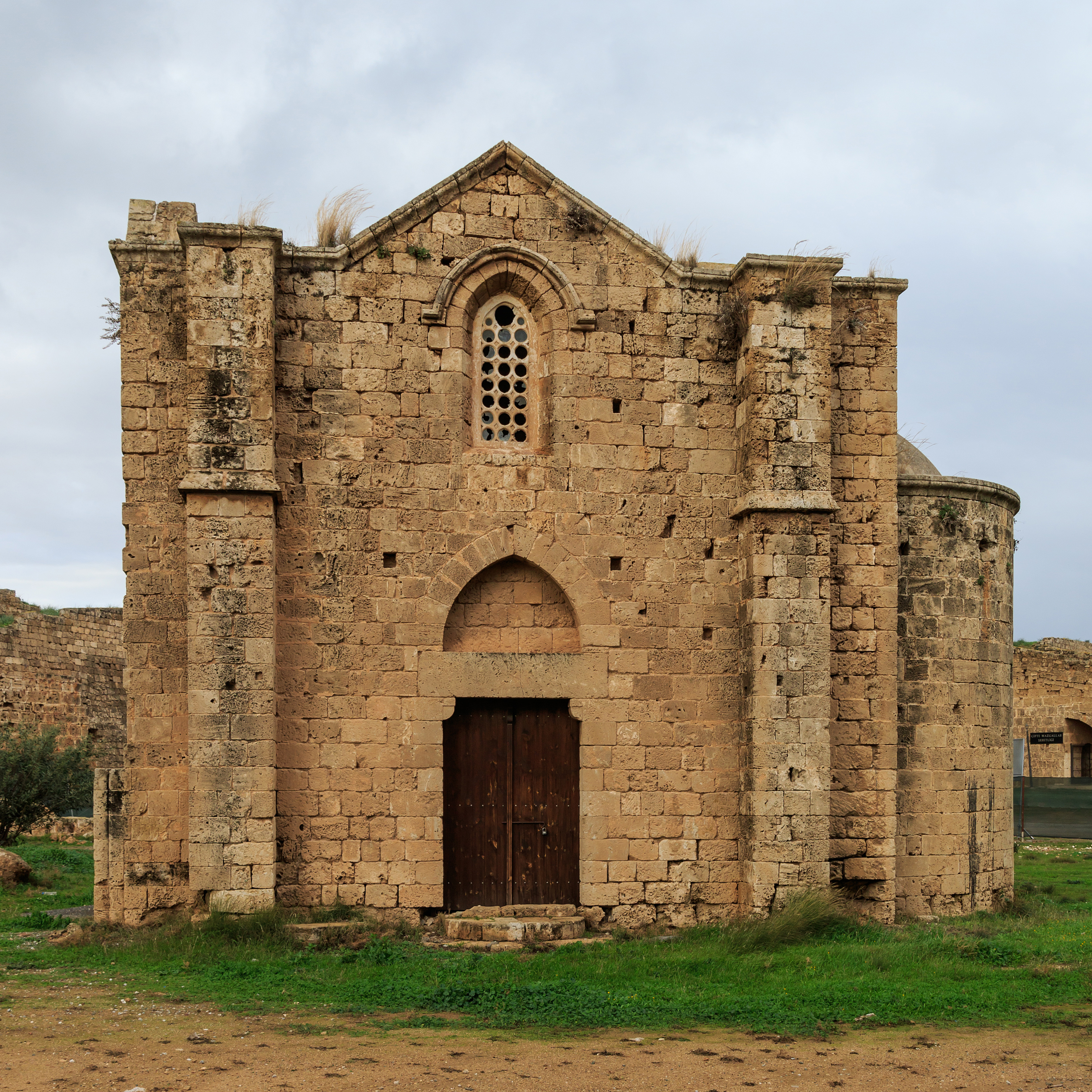
Ganchvor church in Famagusta

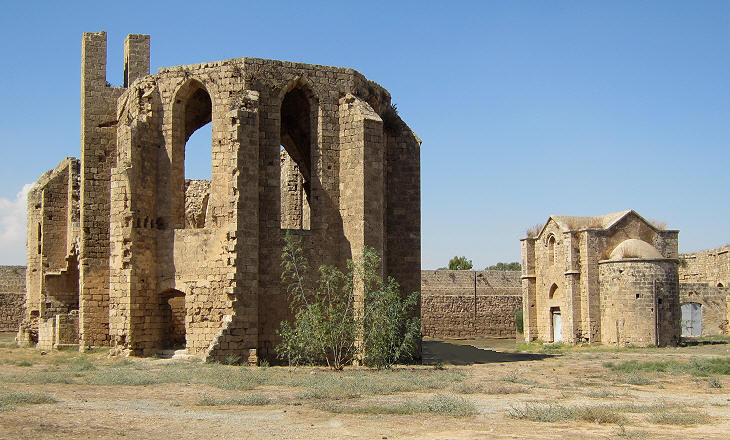
Ganchvor church in Famagusta, next to the Carmelite church

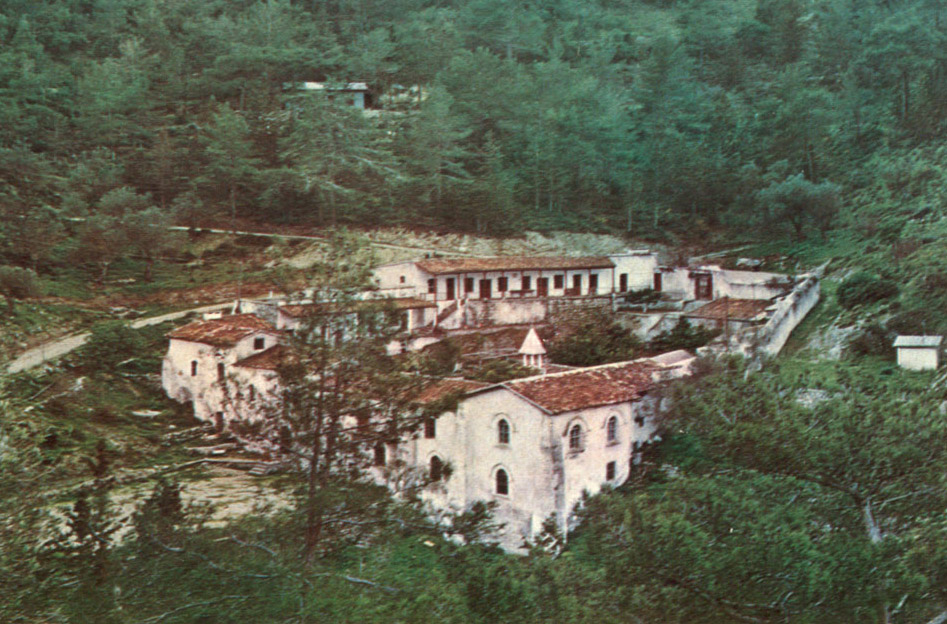
Panoramic view of Saint Makarios monastery in Halevga (1967)

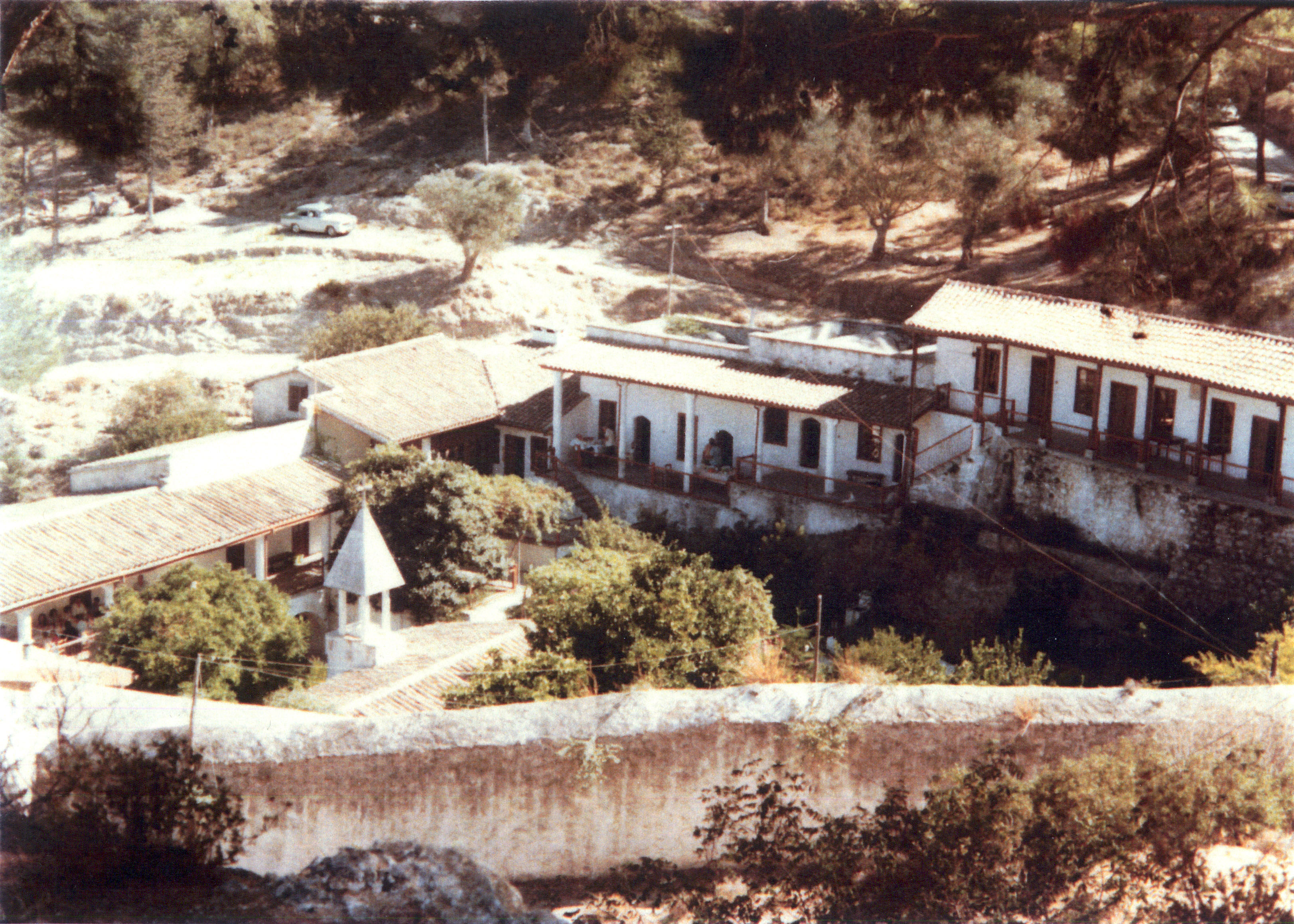
Saint Makarios monastery in Halevga (early 1970s)

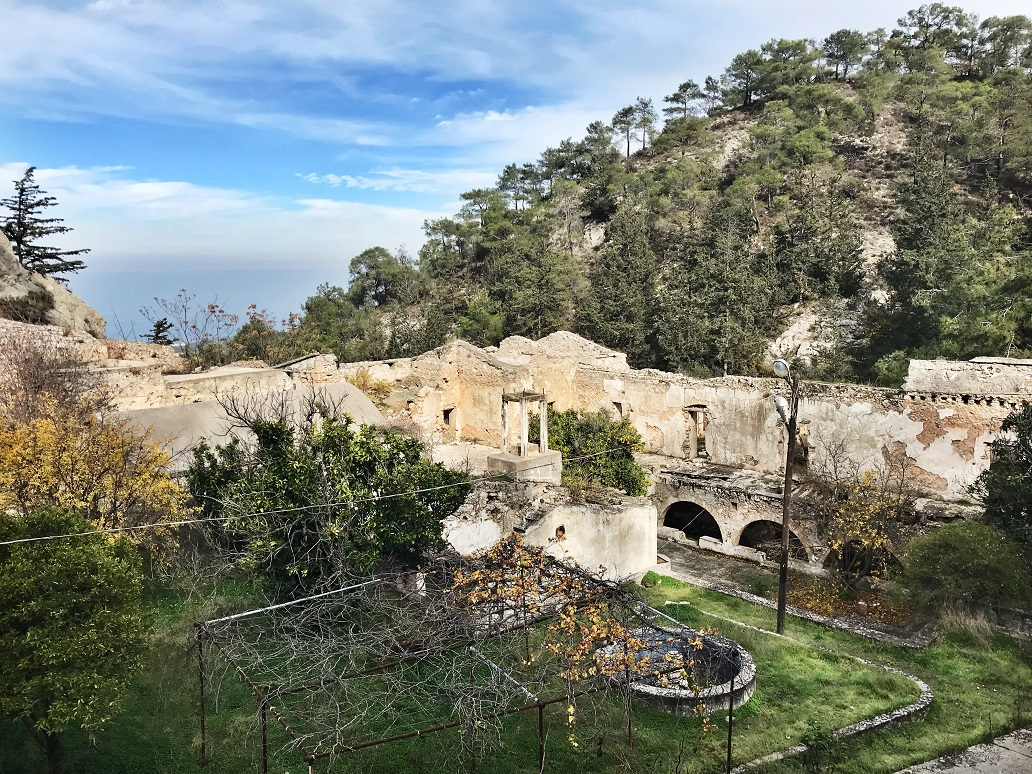
Saint Makarios monastery in Halevga (current view)

== See also ==
- Armenian religion in Cyprus
- Armenians in Cyprus
- Armenian education in Cyprus
