= Holy Mother of God Cathedral, Nicosia =

Coordinates: 35°09′09″N 33°22′02″E

Holy Mother of God Cathedral Սուրբ Աստուածածին Մայր Եկեղեցի
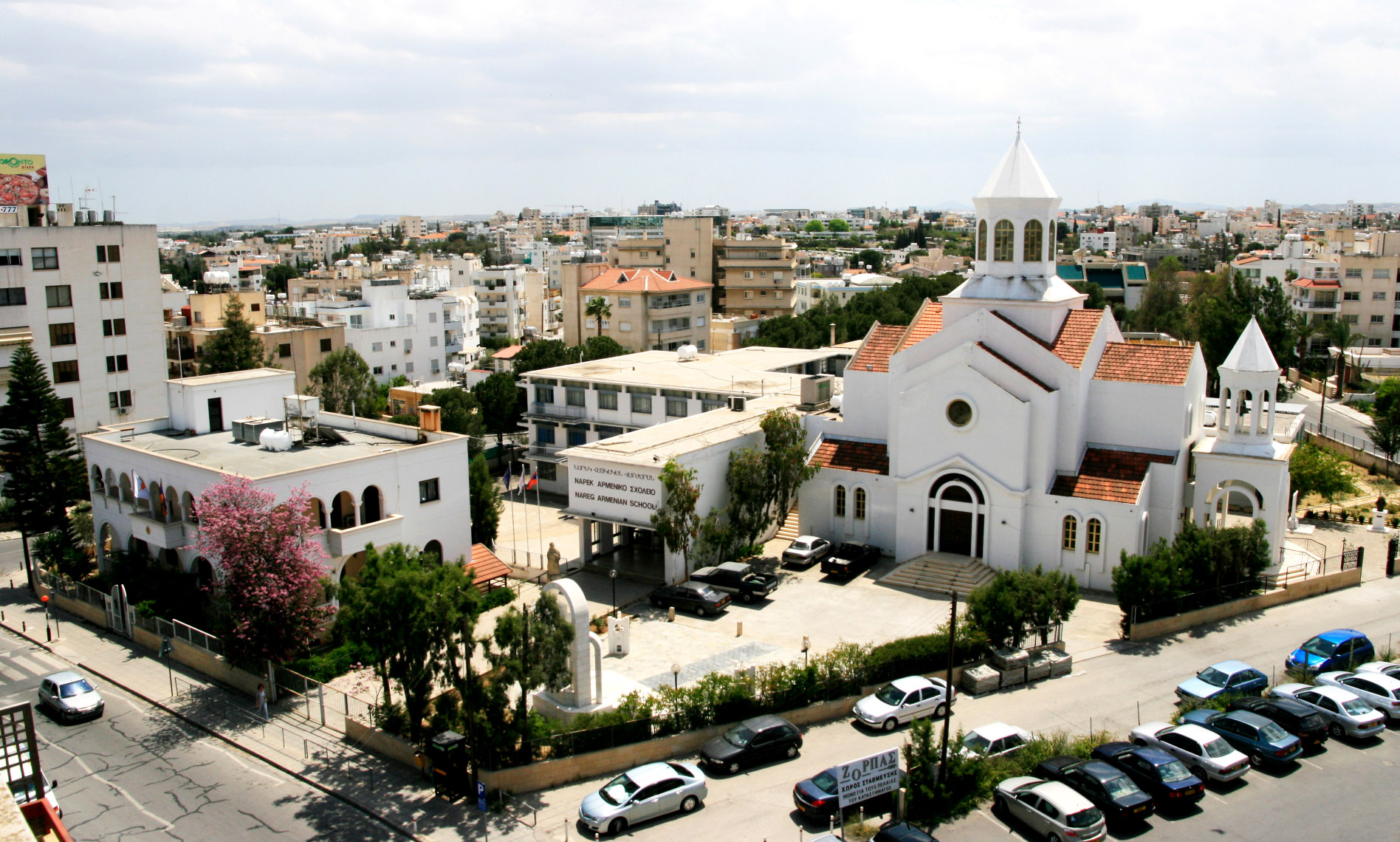

Religion
- Affiliation: Armenian Apostolic Church, Armenian Prelature of Cyprus
- Region: Cyprus
- Ecclesiastical or organisational status: active
- Year consecrated: 1981

Location
- Location: Strovolos, Armenia Avenue, Nicosia, Cyprus
- Interactive map of Holy Mother of God Cathedral; Սուրբ Աստուածածին Մայր Եկեղեցի

Architecture
- Type: Church
- Style: Armenian
- Groundbreaking: 1976

Holy Mother of God Cathedral (Armenian: Սուրբ Աստուածածին Մայր Եկեղեցի), or Sourp Asdvadzadzin cathedral, is the Armenian Apostolic cathedral of the Armenian Prelature of Cyprus, located in Strovolos, Nicosia, capital of Cyprus.

Following the 1963-1964 inter-communal troubles, the Armenian-Cypriot community of Nicosia lost its mediaeval cathedral Notre Dame de Tyre in now Turkish-occupied Nicosia. As a result, Archbishop Makarios III granted them use of the old Ayios Dhometios chapel in Ayios Dhometios.

With the help of the World Council of Churches, the Evangelical Church of Westphalia, the Cyprus government and the faithful, a new cathedral was built in Strovolos, also called "Sourp Asdvadzadzin" (Holy Mother of God). Its foundation stone was laid on 25 September 1976 by Archbishop Makarios III and Bishop Nerses Pakhdigian. It was officially inaugurated on 21 and 22 November 1981 by Catholicos of Cilicia Khoren I Paroian and Co-adjutor Catholicos Karekin II Sarkissian, in the presence of Archbishop Chrysostomos I, Prelate Zareh Aznavorian and Representative Dr. Antranik L. Ashdjian.

It is the only church in Cyprus built in a traditional Armenian style, with a central octagonal dome and a smaller dome for the bell. The church was renovated in 2005 in memory of the Tutundjian family, killed in the Helios air accident, while the belfry was also repaired that year in memory of archpriest Vazken Sandrouni. The church was renovated on the inside in 2008. Many of its icons are the work of Lebanese-Armenian painter Zohrab Keshishian.

In the same complex with this cathedral is the Nicosia Nareg Armenian School (1972), the Armenian Prelature building (1984), the Armenian Genocide monument (1991), the statue of Saint Krikor Naregatsi (1991), a marble khachkar (cross-stone) (2001) and Archbishop Zareh Aznavorian's bust (2005). Below the Prelature building is the "Vahram Utidjian" Hall (1998), venue for many cultural and other events of the community.

Since 6 January 2000, the parish priest is archpriest Momik Habeshian.

== See also ==
- Armenians in Cyprus
- Armenian Prelature of Cyprus
