= Varoujan Hergelian =

Catholicosal Vicar of the Armenian Prelature of Cyprus

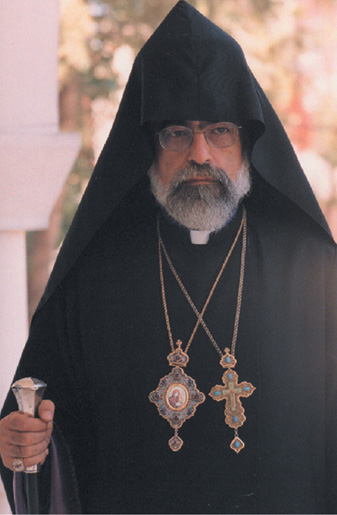
Archbishop Varoujan Hergelian

Archbishop Varoujan Hergelian (Armenian: Վարուժան Արքեպիսկոպոս Հերկելեան) was the Catholicosal Vicar of the Armenian Prelature of Cyprus from August 1997 until May 2014.

Archbishop Varoujan was born on 18 May 1946 in Anjar, Lebanon, as Boghos Hergelian. After graduating from the Seminary School of the Catholicosate of Cilicia in 1967, he served as a teacher & hieromonk, Archimandrite and Bishop in Lebanon, Cyprus and Greece. In Lebanon he served in Zahle and Anjar, in Greece he served in Komotini, Alexandroupoli and Kavala, while in Cyprus he served in Limassol (1970–1974). In August 1997, he was appointed Catholicosal Vicar of the Armenian Prelature of Cyprus as a bishop. In May 2003 he became an archbishop.

In March 1993 he established the Ardziv (in Armenian Արծիւ) literary, cultural, theological and social newspaper, still published today in Antelias, Lebanon on a weekly basis. In October 1997 he established Keghart (in Armenian Գեղարդ), the Prelature's newsletter. With his efforts the basement of the Armenian Prelature of Cyprus' building was transformed into the Vahram Utidjian Hall, a venue for many Armenian Cypriot community events. He introduced, amongst others, the annual Armenian book fair and other cultural and religious functions of the Armenian Prelature of Cyprus and he has inaugurated a number of monuments.

== Publications ==
So far, he has published four books on the archives of the Armenian Prelature of Cyprus:

- Ատանայի վկաները եւ Սուրբ Ստեփանոս վկայարանը - 1909, Լառնագա (2010) [The martyrs of Adana and the testimony of Saint Stephen - 1909, Larnaca].
- Թղթակցութիւն Սահակ Բ. Կաթողիկոսի եւ Պետրոս Արք. Սարաճեանի (2010) [Correspondence of Catholicos Sahag II and Archbishop Bedros Saradjian].
- Կիպրոսի Թեմի հովուական կարգը եւ Թեմական կազմաւորումը (2011) [The pastoral succession of the Cyprus Diocese and the Diocesan formation].
- Տարագրութիւն, որբեր, Մելգոնեան Հաստատութիւն (2011) [Exile, orphans, Melkonian Institute].

He has also published other books, the most prominent of which is Η Αρμενική Εκκλησία στην Κύπρο (in Armenian Հայաստանեայց Եկեղեցի Կիպրոսի մէջ meaning The Armenian Church in Cyprus') (2003).

== Sources ==
- Who's who in Cyprus, Nicosia: Pan Publishing House (2009).
