= Armenian religion in Cyprus =

Like most communities of the Armenian diaspora, the Armenian-Cypriot community is predominantly Armenian Apostolic (about 95%). Some 5% belong either to the Armenian Evangelical Church, the Armenian Catholic Church, the Latin Church, the Greek Orthodox Church, the Anglican Church, the Plymouth Brethren Church, the Seventh-day Adventist Church or are Jehovah's Witnesses; of this 5%, historically the most significant groups have been Armenian Evangelicals, who in the 1940s and 1950s comprised about 10% of the Armenian-Cypriot community, and Armenian-Catholics, who have been on the island since the time of the Crusades.

== Armenian Apostolic Church ==
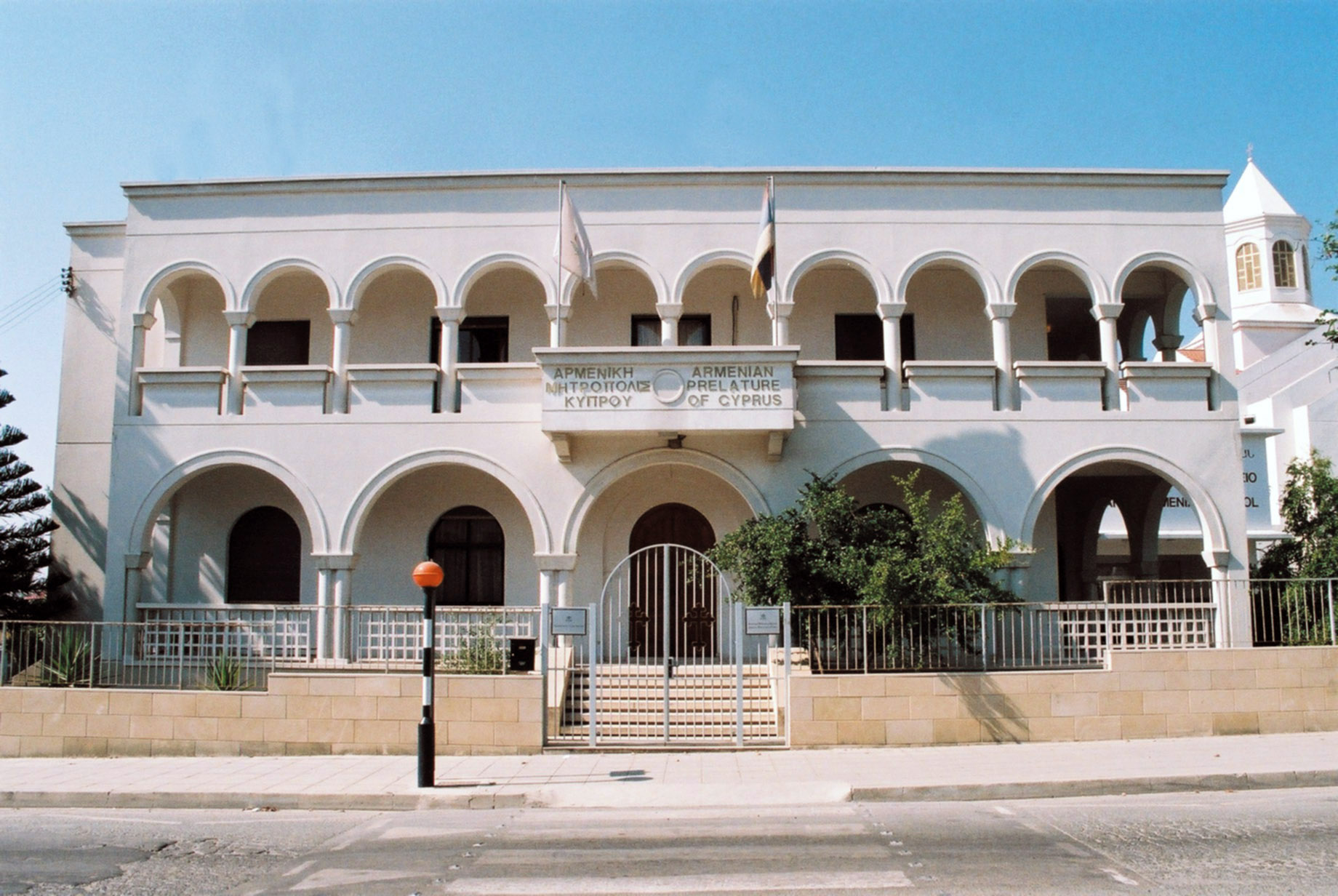
The building of the Armenian Prelature of Cyprus in Strovolos, Nicosia

The Armenian Prelature of Cyprus was established in 973 by Catholicos Khatchig I. In the years that followed, some of its prelates participated in important church synods, such as Tateos (who participated in the Council of Hromkla in 1179), Nigoghaos (who participated in the Synod of Sis in 1307) and Krikor (who participated in a conference of Greek Orthodox Bishops in Cyprus in 1340). The antiquity of the Armenian Church in Cyprus was confirmed by a bull of Pope Leo X, which was issued in 1519 after multiple discords, according to which the Armenian prelate would be senior to and take precedence over the Maronite, Jacobite and Coptic prelates.

Historically, the prelature has been under the jurisdiction of the Catholicosate of the Great House of Cilicia, and is the oldest theme under its jurisdiction. During the Ottoman era and the early British era, for various reasons, it was at times under the Armenian Patriarchate of Jerusalem (1775–1799, 1812–1837, 1848–1861, 1865–1877, 1888–1897, and 1898–1908), the Armenian Patriarchate of Constantinople (1759–1775, 1799–1812, 1861–1864, 1877–1888, 1897–1898, and 1908–1921), nad the Catholicosate of Etchmiadzin (1864–1865). Cyprus was the place of refuge for two exiled patriarchs of Constantinople, Archbishop Tavit Areveltsi (1644–1648) and Senior Archimandrite Krikor Basmadjian (1773–1775).

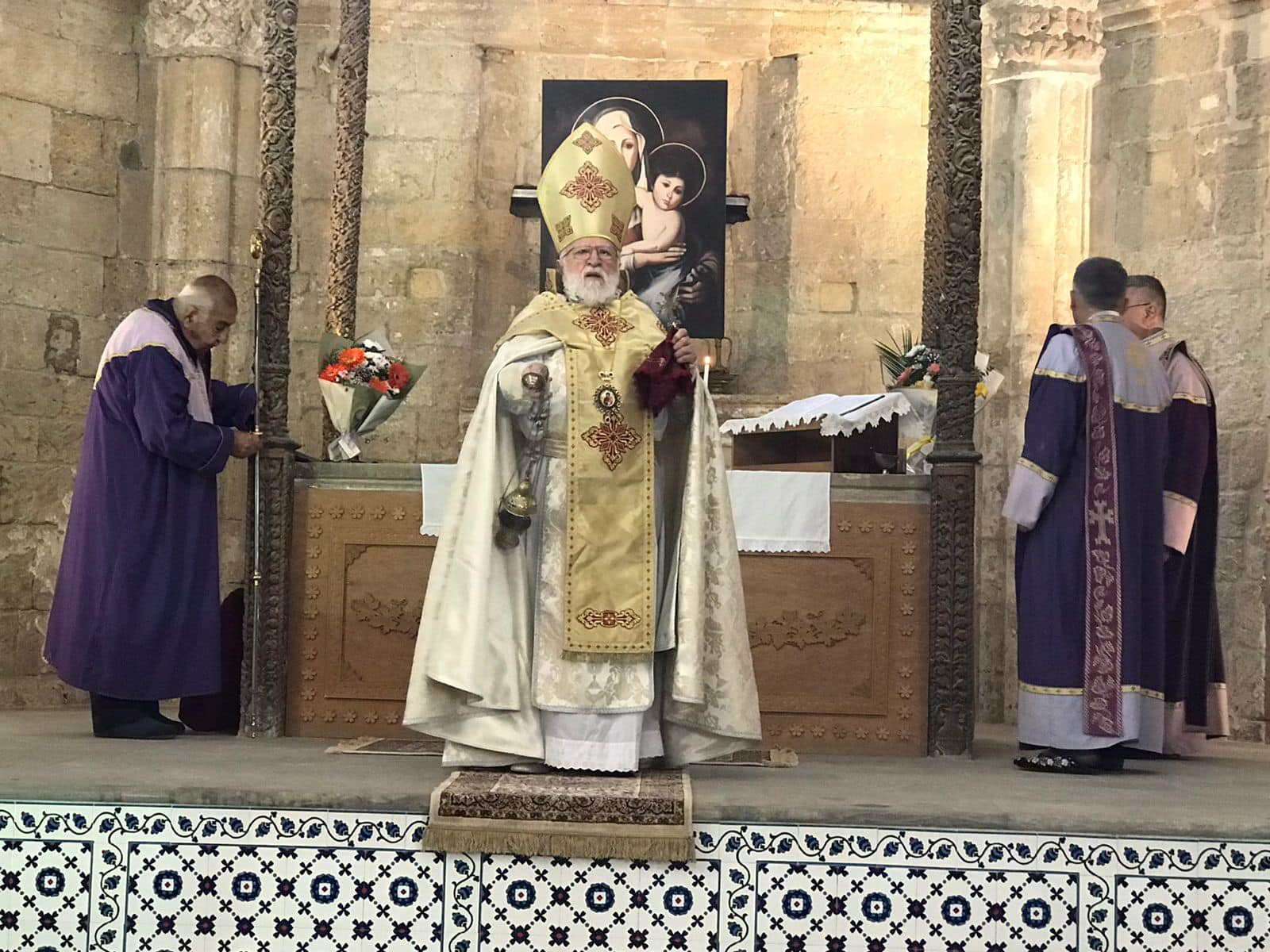
Archbishop Gomidas officiating in the old Virgin Mary cathedral, occupied Nicosia (2024)

For centuries, the prelature building was located within the Armenian compound on Victoria Street in walled Nicosia; when that area was taken over by Turkish-Cypriot extremists in 1963–1964, the prelature was temporarily housed on Aram Ouzounian Street (1964–1968) and, later, on Kyriakos Matsis Street in Ayios Dhometios (1968–1984). A new prelature building was erected in 1983 due to the efforts of Bishop Zareh Aznavorian and with financial aid from the Evangelical Church of Westphalia. The new building is located next to the Holy Mother of God Cathedral and the Nareg school and was designed by architects Charilaos Dikaios and Athos Dikaios. It was officially inaugurated on 4 March 1984, during the pastoral visit of Catholicos Karekin II. It was inaugurated on 3 February 1999 by Catholicos Aram I; numerous charity, communal and cultural events take place there. The prelature's consistory houses a collection of ecclesiastical relics, some of which were previously in the Notre Dame de Tyre church or the Sourp Magar Monastery.

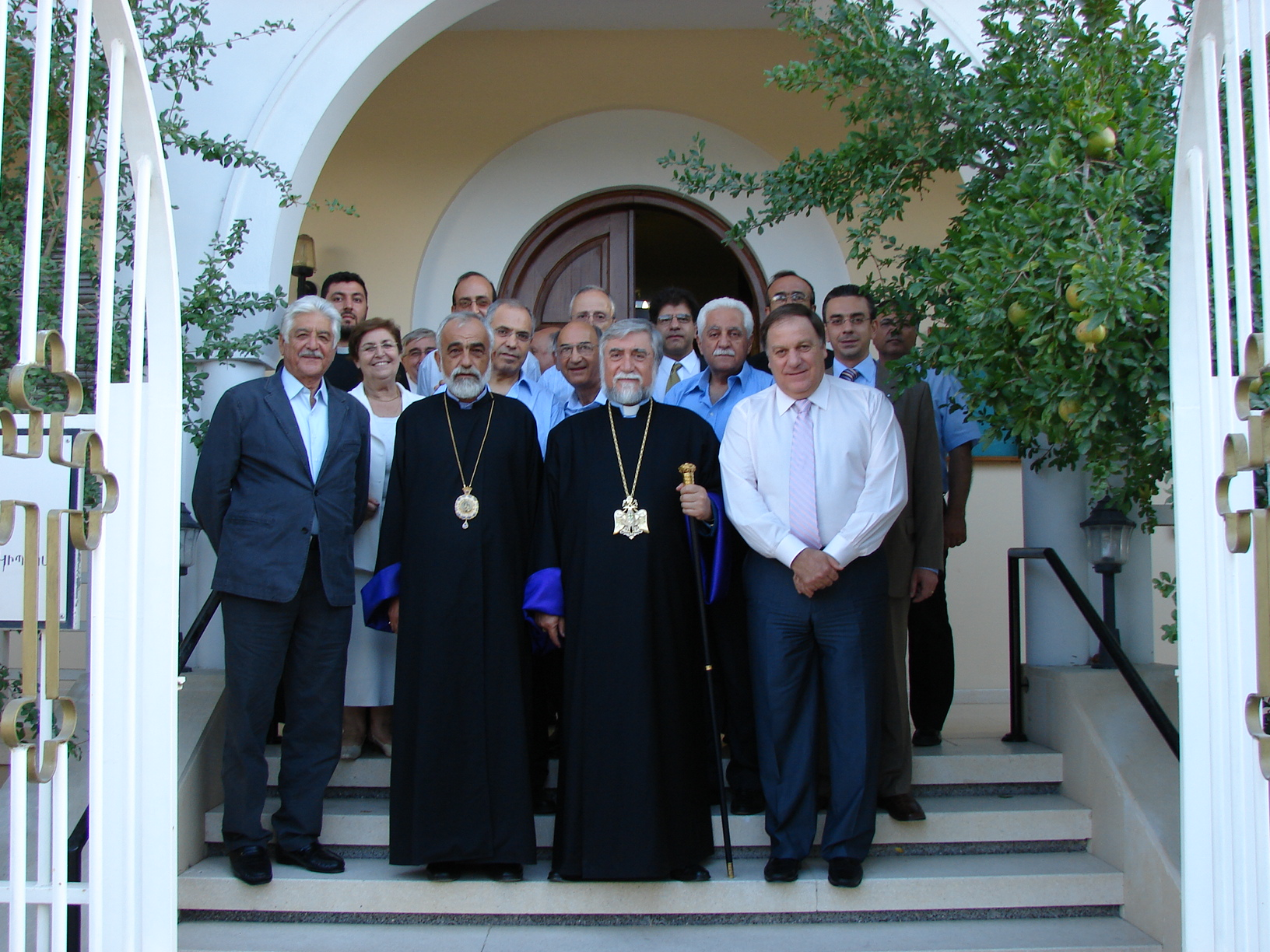
The Armenian Ethnarchy of Cyprus with Catholicos Aram I (2008)

The current charter of the prelature, first drafted in 1945 and ratified in 1950, consists of 102 articles and, in its present form, applies as of 3 September 2010. The administration is exercised by the Armenian Ethnarchy (Ազգային Իշխանութիւն) through the Diocesan Council, consisting of the Prelate, two priests and twelve elected lay people (7 for Nicosia, 3 for Larnaca, 1 for Limassol and 1 for Famagusta) and the Administrative Council, presided by the prelate and consisting of seven lay persons appointed by the Temagan, currently chaired by Sebouh Tavitian (as of 2007) and John Guevherian (as of 2011), respectively. As of 1998, the elected representative is ex officio a member of the Diocesan Council. There are also the local parish committees (թաղական հոգաբարձութիւններ, one in Nicosia, one in Larnaca and one in Limassol), the committee for Christian instruction and the ladies' committee. Under the committee for Christian instruction are the Sunday schools and youth committee.

According to the Decision of the Council of Ministers 66.589/19–12–2007, the Armenian Prelature of Cyprus receives an annual grant of €59,800 from the Republic of Cyprus; Cyprus also pays the salaries of the prelature's clergy and covers their medical and health care (Decision of the Council of Ministers 48.166/22–07–1998). The same arrangements apply for the Maronite Archbishopric of Cyprus and the Latin Vicariate of Cyprus (the latter, however, receives an annual grant of €51,260).

=== List of Prelates ===
Prelates, Catholicosal Vicars and locum tenentes of the Armenian Prelature of Cyprus
Year	Prelate	Year	Prelate	Year	Prelate	Year	Prelate	Year	Prelate
...1179...	Bishop Tateos	1715–1735	Archimandrite Haroutiun	...1844...	Archimandrite Tateos	1884	priest Hovhannes Papazian	1959	Bishop Hrant Khachadourian
...1307...	Bishop Nigoghaos	1734–1735	Archimandrite Haroutiun	1846–1848	Archbishop Hovhannes Marashtsi	1885–1889	priest Hovhannes Shahinian	1960–1968	Senior Archimandrite Yervant Apelian
...1340...	Bishop Krikor	...1736...	Archimandrite Mardiros Sisetsi	1848	Bishop Hovhannes Yetessian	1889–1896	Archimandrite Khoren Portoukalian	1968–1973	Senior Archimandrite Arsen Avedikian
1421–1425	Bishop Levon	1744–1745	Bishop Tavit	1854	Bishop Hovhannes Mamigonian	1896–1897	priest Ghevont Der Nahabedian	1973–1974	archpriest Vazken Sandrouni
1446–1467	Bishop Sarkis	1751–1753	Archimandrite Hovsep	1856	Bishop Apraham Bulbul	1897–1899	priest Hovhannes Shahinian	1974–1977	Bishop Nerses Pakhdigian
1504–1515	Bishop Tavit	1773–1774	Senior Archimandrite Krikor Basmadjian	1857–1859	Archimandrite Boghos Vanetsi	1899–1905	Archimandrite Bedros Saradjian	1977–1983	Bishop Zareh Aznavorian
1553–1567	Bishop Ghougas	...1779	Bishop Mardiros	1859–1861	Archimandrite Atanas Izmirtsi	1906–1907	Archimandrite Yeremia Liforian	1983–1997	Senior Archimandrite Yeghishe Mandjikian
1567...	Bishop Hovhannes	1783–1799	Bishop Hagop	1864–1865	Archimandrite Tateos Yeretsian	1907–1910	priest Hovhannes Shahinian	1997–2014	Archbishop Varoujan Hergelian
1581	Hieromonk Stepanos	1799–1812	Archbishop Hovhannes	1865–1869	Archimandrite Ghougas Khanigian	1910–1912	priest Ghevont Der Nahabedian	2014–2016	Archbishop Nareg Alemezian
...1618...	Monk Vartan	1812–1814	Archimandrite Bedros	1870–1872	Archimandrite Vartan Mamigonian	1912–1917	priest Sahag Minassian	2016–2017	priest Mashdots Ashkarian
...1642...	Archimandrite Mesrob	1814–1816	Archimandrite Stepanos	1872–1873	Archimandrite Movses Geomrukdjian	1918–1919	Senior Archimandrite Yervant Perdahdjian	2017–2024	Archbishop Khoren Toghramadjian
1644	Bishop Tavit Areveltsi	1816–1817	Archimandrite Teotoros	1873–1874	Archimandrite Maghakia Derounian	1920	Archbishop Taniel Hagopian	2024–present	Archbishop Gomidas Ohanian
...1665...	priest Sahag	1817–1819	Bishop Tionesios Garabedian	1874–1876	Archimandrite Mesrob Ghaltakhdjian	1920–1940	Archbishop Bedros Saradjian		
...1668...	Bishop Hovhannes	1821	Archimandrite Stepanos	1876–1877	Archimandrite Garabed Pakradouni	1936–1940	Archimandrite Barouyr Minassian		
...1670...	Bishop Melidon	1822–1827	Archimandrite Kapriel	1878–1880	archpriest Hovhannes Hunkiarbeyendian	1940–1946	archpriest Khoren Kouligian		
1675–1695	Archimandrite Sarkis Cholakh	1827–1833	Archimandrite Haroutiun Izmirtsi	1880–1881	Archimandrite Zakaria Yeghissian	1946–1956	Archbishop Ghevont Chebeyan		
1704–1705	Archimandrite Minas Amtetsi	1837–1843	Bishop Hovhannes	1881–1883	Archimandrite Movses Geomrukdjian	1956–1960	archpriest Khoren Kouligian		

== Armenian Evangelical Church ==
The first Armenian Evangelicals in Cyprus came after the arrival of the British in July 1878. As they were not committed, and very few, they quickly became associated with the Armenian Apostolic Church. With the influx of more Protestants, Armenian Evangelicals became affiliated with the Reformed Presbyterian Church as early as 1887. Although the main centres were Nicosia and Larnaca, gatherings were occasionally held in Limassol, Famagusta and Amiandos. In Larnaca, gatherings were held at the Reformed Presbyterian mission church (built in 1892 and re-built in 1901–1902). In Nicosia, gatherings were initially held at the Reformed Presbyterian mission church (built in 1906–1907), until Armenian Evangelicals built their own church in 1946–1947 behind the old American Academy building, near the Arab Ahmet Mosque; its foundation stone was laid on 28 July 1946 by pastor Yohanna der Megerditchian, who dedicated it on 1 June 1947. The building was renovated in 1955, while a kitchen was added in 1959.

In 1933, the newly formed Cyprus Synod of the Reformed Presbyterian Church divided its congregations into Armenian and Greek councils. Armenian Evangelicals were granted provisional autonomy from the Reformed Presbyterian mission in 1954, which was formalised in 1962. In Larnaca, as Armenian Evangelicals dwindled after the inter-communal troubles of 1963–1964, services were no longer held; in Nicosia, the Armenian Evangelical church was taken over by Turkish Cypriots and so services were then held at the American Academy chapel (built in 1955) until 1973.

After nearly 30 years of inactivity, by initiative of Nevart Kassouni-Panayiotides and Lydia Gulesserian and with the help of Hrayr Jebejian, Executive Secretary of the Bible Society in the Gulf, Armenian Evangelicals were re-organised at the Greek Evangelical church in Larnaca in 2002. Since 2005, when Hrayr Jebejian moved to Cyprus, services are held every few months at the Greek Evangelical church in Nicosia. Also, the Armenian Evangelical Church organizes a few lectures in Nicosia.

Armenian reverends and preachers in charge of the Armenian Evangelical community of Cyprus
Headmaster	Term	Jurisdiction	Headmaster	Term	Jurisdiction	Headmaster	Term	Jurisdiction
Reverend Haroutiun Sarkissian	1898–1905	Cyprus	Reverend Hagop Sagherian	1946–1954	Cyprus	Aram Sarkissian	1964–1966	Cyprus
Reverend Siragan G. Aghbabian	1920–1932	Cyprus	Manuel Kassouni	1954–1962	Larnaca	Mihran Jizmejian	1967–1973	Cyprus
Reverend Haroutiun Manoushagian	1922–1927	Nicosia	Nshan Halvadjian	1954–1964	Nicosia	Hrayr Jebejian	2005–present	Cyprus
Reverend Yohanna Der Megerditchian	1933–1947	Cyprus	Levon Yergatian	1962–1964	Nicosia, Limassol			

== Armenian Catholic Church ==
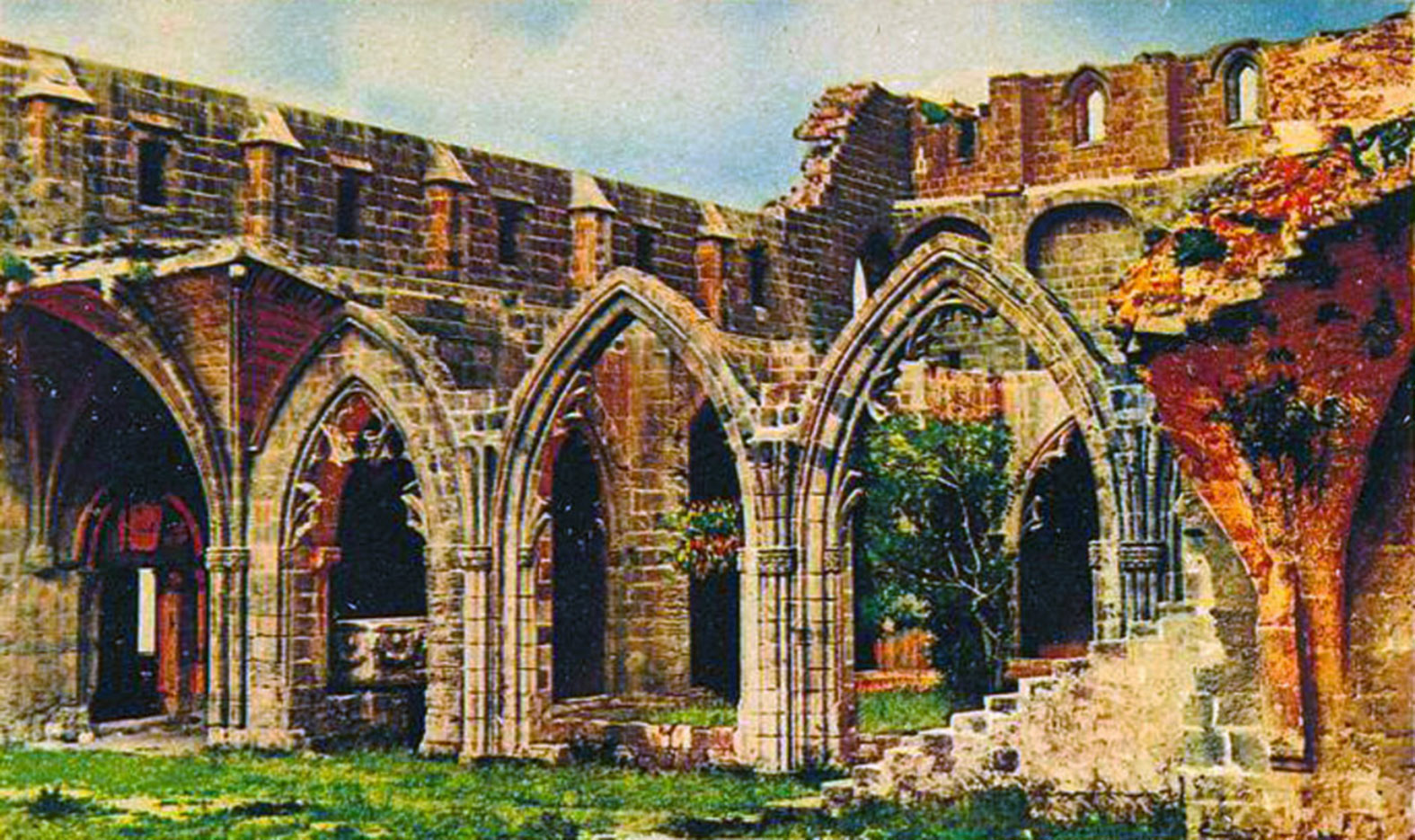
The Bellapais Abbey (early 20th century)

Armenian Catholics first came to the island during the Frankish era from the nearby Armenian Kingdom of Cilicia. It is unclear whether they had their own structure during the Latin era or if they were under the Latin Church of Cyprus, as has been the case since the Ottoman era. They used the Church of Saint Lazarus in Larnaca, the Holy Cross church in Nicosia (probably Arablar Djami/Stavros tou Missirikou) and the Virgin Mary of the Green in Famagusta, built between 1311 and 1317. Armenian Catholic monks and nuns also served at the Premonstratensian Bellapais Abbey and the Benedictine Notre Dame de Tyre convent in Nicosia, respectively. The only Armenian Catholic bishops' names which have survived until today are George Noreghes, appointed by Latin Archbishop of Cyprus Elias de Nabineaux c. 1340, and the Dominican Julio or Julian Stavriano, who served as Bishop of the Armenians (1561–1567) and later became Bishop of the Maronites (1567–1570); he started as Armenian Orthodox and later embraced Catholicism. The latter's flock included about 1,000 Armenians and he used Saint Sergius' church in Famagusta.

During the Ottoman era, there was a very limited conversion of Armenian Orthodox to Catholicism, mainly due to the proselytising activities of the Franciscan mission in Nicosia and Larnaca, especially during the 17th and 18th centuries; however, these must have been temporary apostasies and their number never exceeded 50 at any given time. In 1794 the small (and perhaps newly formed) Armenian Catholic community of Larnaca was granted some holy chalices from the auction of the belongings of the old Capuchin monastery of the town.

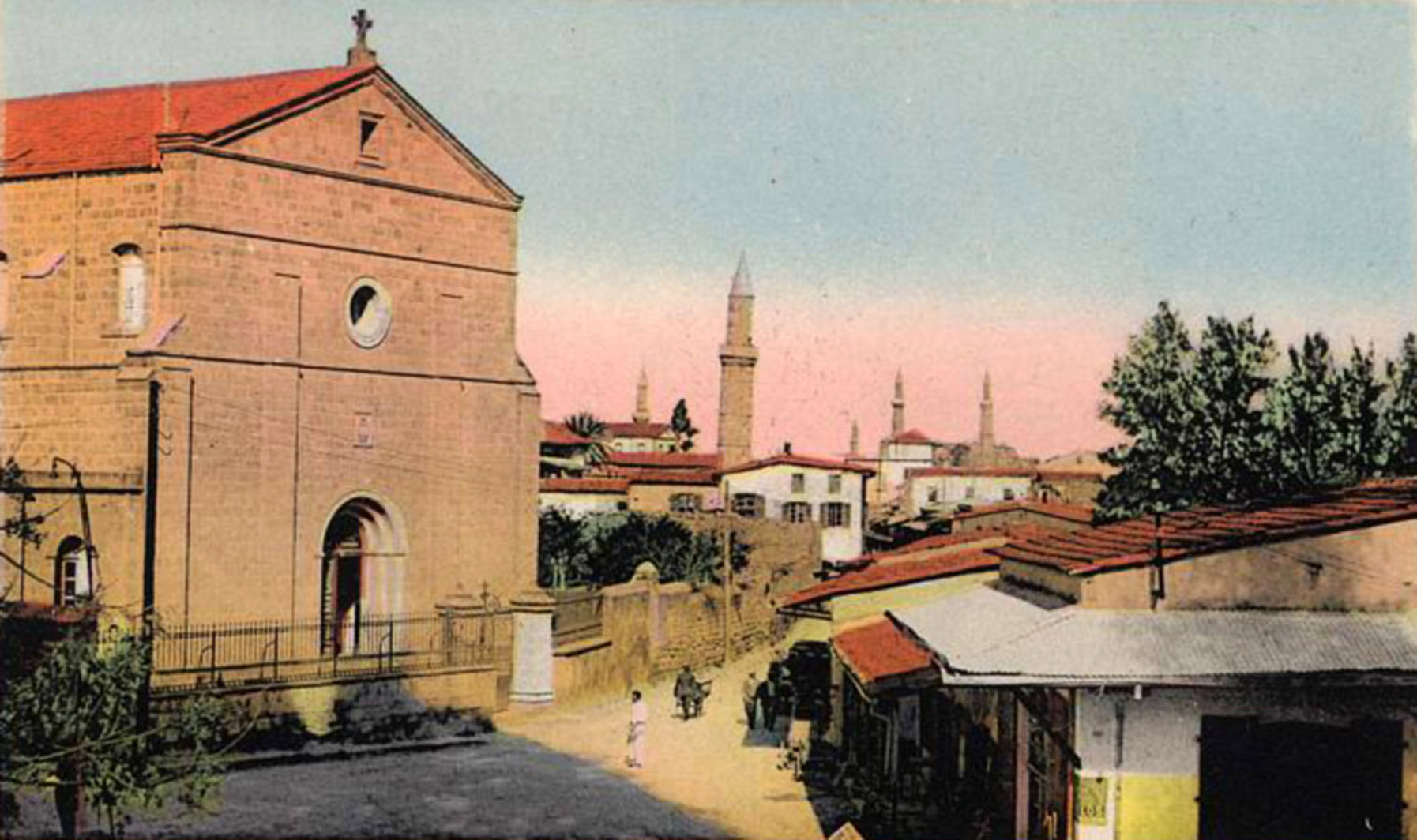
The Holy Cross cathedral in Nicosia (early 20th century)

During the British era that the Armenian Catholic community increased in number, due to the arrival of a large number of refugees from the Armenian genocide. In 1931, there were about 200 Armenian-Catholics in Cyprus. They were rather poor and many were middle-aged. Most of them became attached to the Latin places of worship, especially the Holy Cross cathedral in Nicosia and Saint Joseph's convent in Larnaca; between 1921 and 1923, the latter housed a small Armenian Catholic school, run by Abbot Jean Kouyoumdjian – who served at the convent between 1921 and 1928. There was also another Armenian Catholic cleric, Archimandrite Arsène Khorassandjian, who also served in Larnaca (and, at times, at the Holy Cross cathedral and the Terra Santa College in Nicosia), between 1931 and 1959.

In 1960, there were less than 100 Armenian Catholics. However, their number decreased in the following years, due to emigration to other countries and assimilation with the Armenian Cypriot, the Latin Cypriot and/or the Greek Cypriot community. However, due to the influx of Lebanese Armenians to Cyprus since the mid-1970s, there has been a small increase in the number of Armenian Catholics on the island. Currently, there are less than 20 Catholic Armenian Cypriots, in addition to about 30 foreign Armenians.

== Places of worship ==
There are five Armenian churches, two in the capital Nicosia (one under Turkish occupation since 1964) and one in each Larnaca, Limassol and Famagusta; the latter has been occupied by the Turks since 1964. Additionally, there are three Armenian chapels in the vicinity of Nicosia and one within the Sourp Magar Monastery complex, the latter under Turkish occupation since 1974. There is also an Armenian Evangelical church in Nicosia (under Turkish occupation since 1964).

=== Nicosia ===
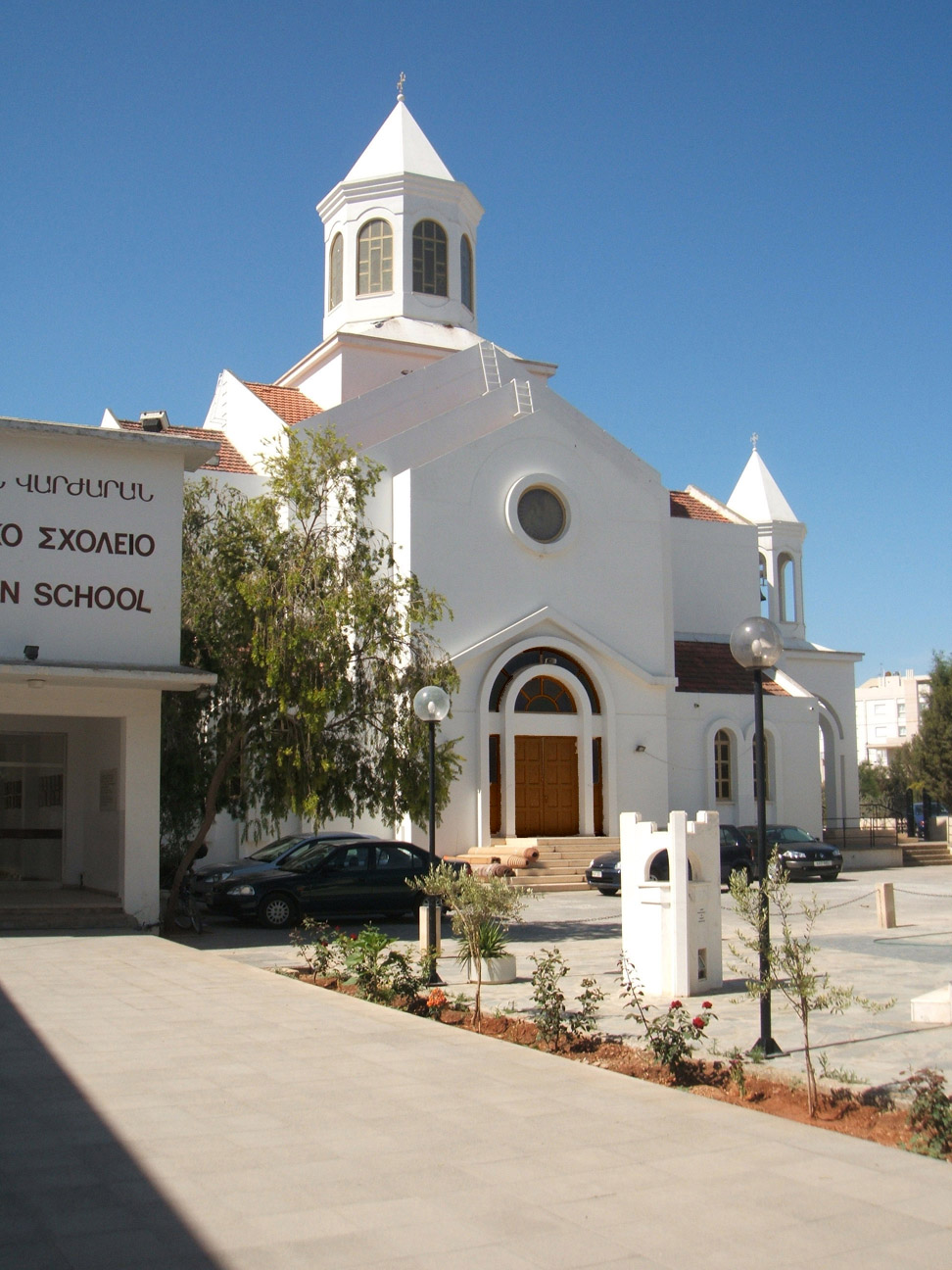
Virgin Mary church in Strovolos, Nicosia

The building of the Armenian Prelature of Cyprus and the Holy Mother of God Cathedral are located on Armenia Street in Strovolos, Nicosia. The prelature building was built between 1983 and 1984 by architects Athos Dikaios and Alkis Dikaios and was inaugurated on 4 March 1984 by Catholicos Karekin II of Cilicia. The prelature's consistory houses a collection of ecclesiastical relics, some of which were previously kept at the Sourp Magar Monastery or the Notre Dame de Tyre; the relics are kept at a display case, donated in 1986 by brothers Garabed and Nshan Arakchindjian. In 1998, on the initiative of Bishop Varoujan Hergelian, the basement of the building was renovated and the "Vahram Utidjian" Hall was created; previously a store room, its creation was funded from the proceeds of the 1994 auction of the art collection that Vahram Utidjian had donated to the prelature in 1954. It is one of the main venues for events of the Armenian Cypriot community. Together with the Holy Mother of God Cathedral and the Nareg Armenian School, the land was granted in trust to the community on 16 December 1966 by the government; on 10 December 1979, the Strovolos Improvement Board decided to rename the road in front of the plot of land from "Cyclops Street" to "Armenia Street", as a gesture of solidarity to the Armenian people. A freehold title deed on the land was granted on 31 March 1983.

The Holy Mother of God Cathedral was built between 1976 and 1981 by architects Iacovos and Andreas Philippou, with financial help from the World Council of Churches, the Evangelical Church of Westphalia, the Republic of Cyprus, the Holy Archbishopric of Cyprus and the faithful. Located next to Nareg Elementary School, its foundation stone was laid on 25 September 1976 by Archbishop Makarios III and Bishop Nerses Pakhdigian. On 16 April 1978, the Co-adjutor Catholicos Karekin II blessed the 16 columns of the church, while the inauguration and consecration of the cathedral took place on 22 November 1981 by Catholicos Khoren I and his Co-adjutor Karekin II. It is the only church in Cyprus built in a traditional Armenian style, with a central octagonal dome and a smaller dome for the bell. The church was renovated externally in late 2005 in memory of the Tutundjian family, killed in the Helios air accident, while the belfry was also repaired that year, in memory of archpriest der Vazken Sandrouni. Liturgies are held every Sunday. The church celebrates the feast day of the Presentation of Mary on the nearest Sunday to 21 November. The parish priest (as of 2000) is Friar Momik Habeshian.

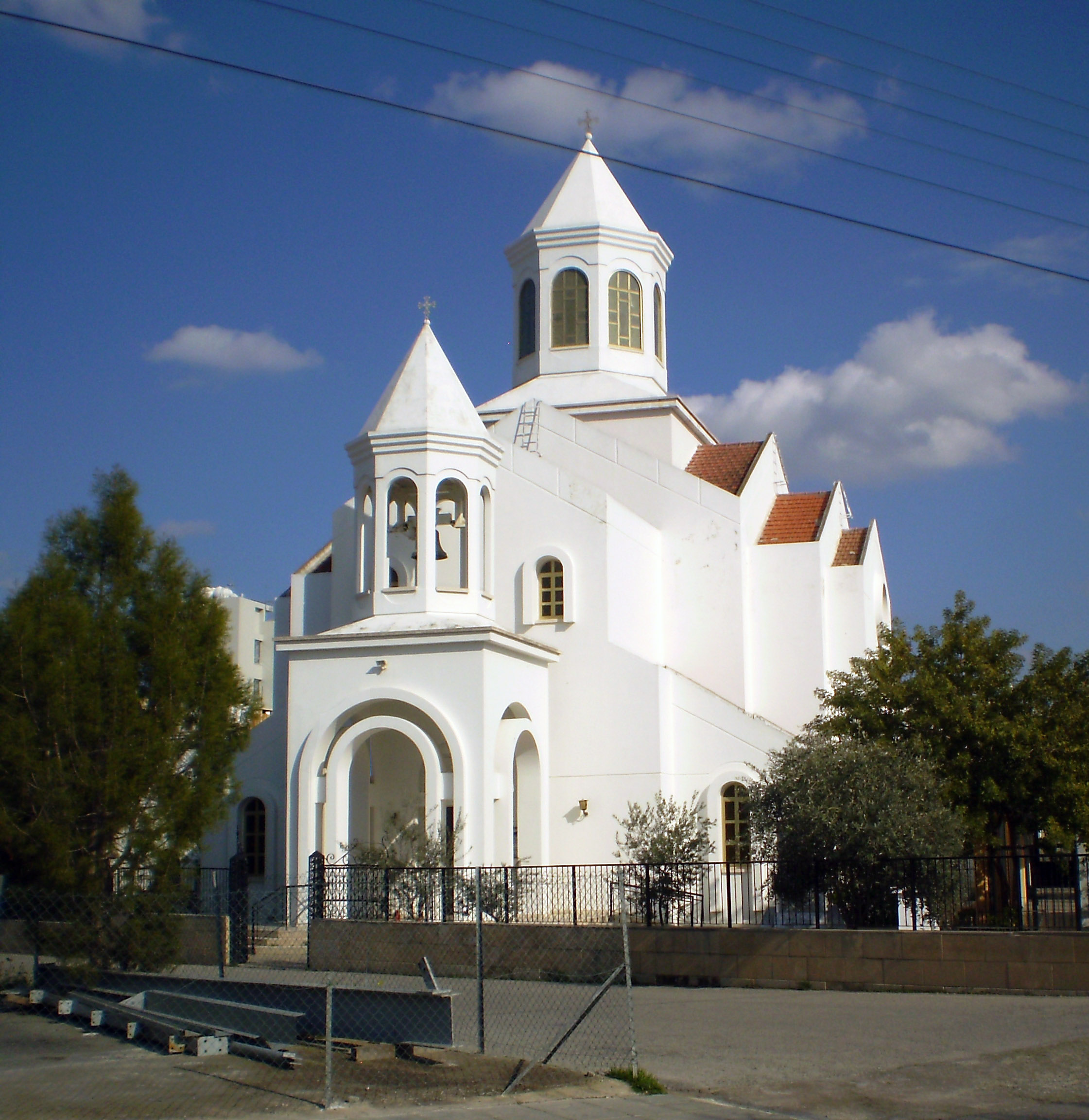
The façade of the Virgin Mary church

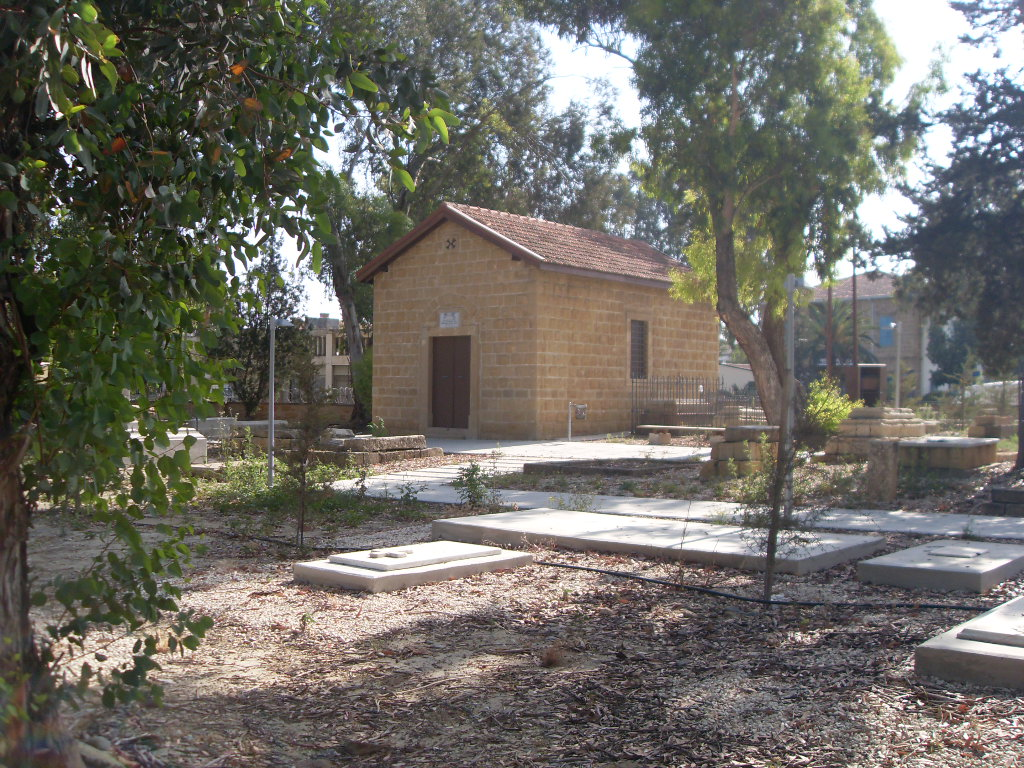
Saint Paul's chapel in Nicosia

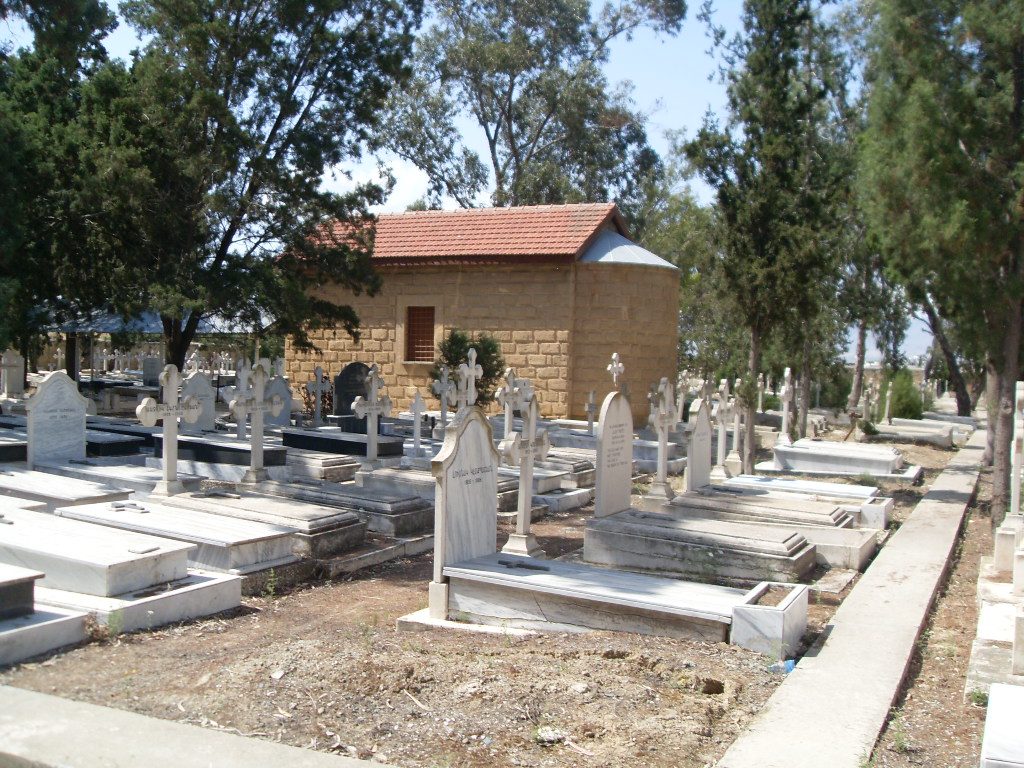
Holy Resurrection chapel in Ayios Dhometios

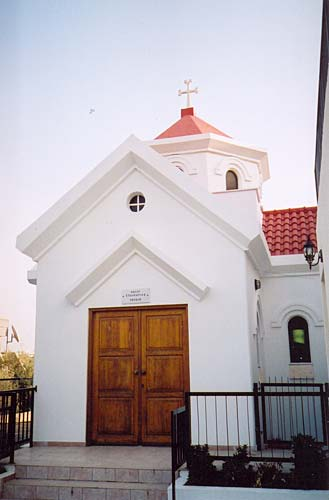
Saviour of All chapel in Strovolos

The church was renovated internally in mid–2008. Many of its icons are the work of Lebanese-Armenian painter Zohrab Keshishian. It is interesting that just below the holy altar, there is a khachkar (cross-stone) donated by the Holy See of Etchmiadzin. On top of the church's entrance there is a marble inscription in Armenian reading:

Կառուցաւ սուրբ եկեղեցիս յանուն Սրբուհւոյ Աստուածածնին ի հայրապետութեան Տ. Տ. Խորենայ Ա. Կաթողիկոսի եւ Աթոռակցի Նորին Տ. Տ. Գարեգին Բ. Կաթողիկոսի եւ յառաջնորդութեան Տ. Զարեհայ Եպիսկոպոսի Ազնաւորեան սրտադիր ջանիւք ամենայն զաւակայ Թեմիս Հայոց Կիպրոսի, եւ առատապարգեւ օժանդակութեամբ Միացեալ Եկեղեցւոյն Վեսթֆալիոյ եւ ձեռնտուութեամբ բարեխնամ կառավարութեամբ Կիպրոսի ի թուին Հայոց ՌՆԼ. Եւ փրկչական 1981 թուին (This holy temple by the name of the Holy Mother of God was constructed during the pontificate of Catholicos His Holiness Khoren I and His Co-adjutor Catholicos His Holiness Karekin II and during the prelacy of Bishop Mr Zareh Aznavorian with the whole-hearted efforts of all the children of the Armenian Diocese of Cyprus, and the generously donated support of the Westphalia United Church and the assistance of the attentive government of Cyprus in the year 1430 of the Armenians and the year of our Lord 1981)

On the two columns facing the entrance are the following two aluminium commemorative plaques in Armenian:

Նորոգեցաւ զանգակատունս ի յիշատակ Տ. Վազգէն Ա. Քհնյ. Սանտրունիի 2005 (This belltower was renovated in memory of Archpriest Der Vazken Sandrouni 2005)

Նորոգեցաւ եկեղեցիս ի յիշատակ Յակոբ, Հիլտա, Արա, Պարէթ Թիւթիւնճեանի 2005 (This church was renovated in memory of Hagop, Hilda, Ara, Baret Tutundjian 2005)

On the side of the church there is a marble inscription in Greek reading:

Ο ιερός ούτος ναός της Παναγίας των Αρμενίων εθεμελιώθη υπό της Α. Μ. του Προέδρου της Κυπριακής Δημοκρατίας Αρχιεπισκόπου Μακαρίου Γ' την 25ην Σεπτεμβρίου 1976 (The foundation of this holy temple of the Mother of God of the Armenians was laid by H. B. the President of the Republic of Cyprus Archbishop Makarios III on 25 September 1976)

In front of the church's entrance is a white marble khachkar (cross-stone) dedicated to the eternal friendship of Armenians and Greeks in Cyprus; it was unveiled on 21 October 2001 by Presidential Commissioner Manolis Christophides. To the side of the church's entrance is the bronze bust of Archbishop Zareh Aznavorian; it was unveiled on 1 May 2005 by Italian Armenian donator Aleco Bezigian. Finally, in the courtyard of the church is the white marble Armenian Genocide Monument; it was unveiled on 24 April 1991 by Senior Archimandrite Yeghishe Madjikian. In 2000, two white marble ossuaries were built in front of it, as well as five small sandstone khachkar-like columns.

In the old Armenian cemetery, near the Ledra Palace Hotel (Markos Drakos Avenue), there is the Sourp Boghos chapel, built in 1892 by donations from Boghos Odadjian. Left unused since the 1963–1964 intercommunal troubles, the chapel and the cemetery fell into disuse. It was restored between 2008 and 2009, together with the rest of the cemetery, on the initiative of Representative Vartkes Mahdessian and the Armenian Ethnarchy of Cyprus. A liturgy is held once a year since 2010. On top of the chapel's entrance there is a marble inscription in Armenian reading:

Կառուցաւ ս. տաճարս 'ի հիմանց յանուն Ս. Առաքելոցն Պօղոսի արդեամբ բարեպաշտ Օտաճեան Պօղոսի Կ. Պօլսեցւոյ. Յամի Տ՟ռն 1892 (This holy temple was constructed from its foundations by the name of the Holy Apostle Paul by commission of the pious Constantinopolitan Odadjian Boghos in the Lord's Year 1892)

Behind it, from inside the chapel, there is another marble inscription in Armenian reading:

Կառուցաւ մատուռս արդեամբ Օտաճեան Պօպոսի, մասնակցութեամբ արկեղ Եկեղեցւոյ Հայոց ազգի, Յ' Առաջնորդութեամբ Տ. Խորենայ Վարդապէտի, Յ' Ամի Տեառն 1892.ի: (This chapel was constructed by commission of Odadjian Boghos, with the participation of the fund of the Church of the Armenian nation, during the prelacy of Archimandrite Mr Khoren, in the Lord's Year 1892.)

In the Armenian cemetery near Ayios Dhometios (Gregoris Afxentiou Avenue) is the Sourp Haroutiun Chapel, built in 1938 by donation of Haroutiun Bohdjalian and consecrated in 1949 by Bishop Ghevont Chebeyan. Left unused since the 1974 Turkish invasion, it was renovated in 2010. No Liturgies have been held since 1974. On top of its entrance, there is a marble inscription in Armenian reading:

Ս. Յարութիւն: Շինեցաւ Ս. Յարութիւն մատուռս արդեամբ Տիար Յարութիւն Պօհճալեանի ի յիշատակ իւր եւ իւր ննջեցելոց 1938: (Holy Resurrection. This Holy resurrection chapel was built by commission of Mr Haroutiun Bohdjalian in memory of him and his deceased 1938.)

On the lower part of the southern wall, there is the following well-known inscription in Armenian:

Մահուամբ զմահ կոխեաց եւ Յարութեամբն Իւրով մեզ զկեանս պարգեւեաց (He trampled death with death and through His Resurrection He granted us life)

The Holy Saviour of All chapel was built between 1995 and 1996 by architects Athos and Alkis Dikaios with donations from Aram and Bedros Kalaydjian. It is located on Corinth Street in Strovolos, Nicosia, within the premises of the Kalaydjian Rest Home for the Elderly, its foundation stone was laid on 15 December 1995 by the Catholicos of the Great House of Cilicia, Aram I, who inaugurated it on 16 February 1997. Matins are held regularly. On top of its entrance, there is a marble inscription in Armenian reading:

Սուրբ Ամենափրկիչ մատուռ (Holy Saviour of All chapel)

=== Larnaca ===
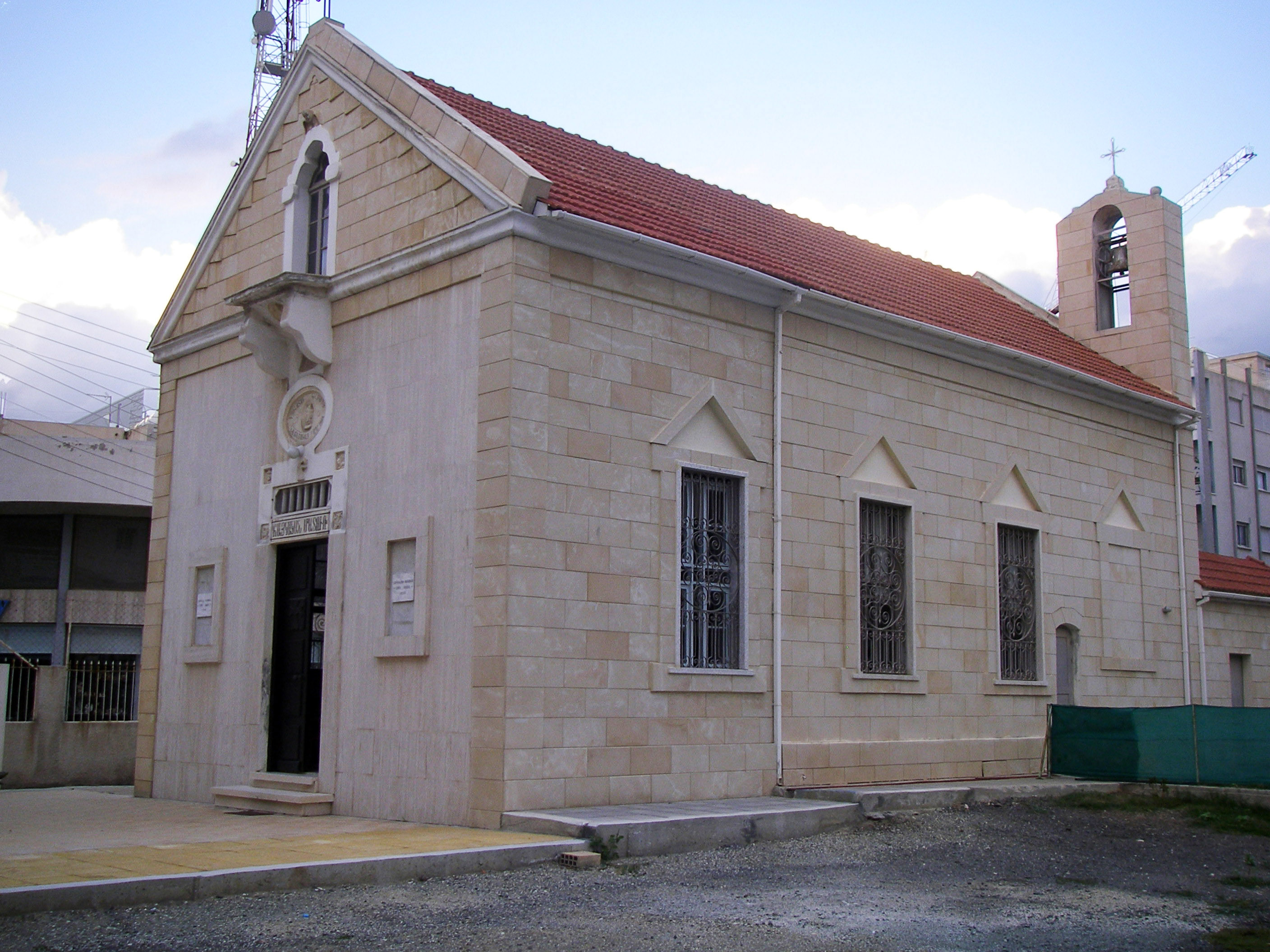
Saint Stephen's church in Larnaca

The Sourp Stepanos Church, on Armenian Church Street in the city centre, was originally built as a chapel by the Armenian refugees who came to Larnaca after the Adana massacre in 1909. It was built as a replica of Adana's main church and was dedicated to Adana's patron Saint, Saint Stephen. However, as most of the refugees returned, the chapel was left unfinished. After fund-raising, which started on 24 October 1912, the chapel became a church, with construction finished on 1 April 1913.

Dedicated to the memory of the martyrs of the Adana massacre, it is the first monument in the entire Armenian diaspora in memory of the Armenian massacres in the Ottoman Empire. On top of the church's façade there is a commemorative composition featuring the Armenian ethnarch Hayk, the last King of the Armenian Kingdom of Cilicia, Leo V, a scroll held by a hand – representing the Ten Commandments – and the four symbols of the Four Evangelists; around Leo V, there is a commemorative inscription in Armenian:

Ի Յիշատակ Կիլիկիոյ Նահատակաց – 1 Ապր. 1909 (In Memory of the Cilician Martyrs – 1 April 1909)

Under the composition and above the entrance it reads:

Հայկական Մատուռ (Armenian Chapel)

The church was inaugurated on 20 May 1914 by Senior Archimandrite Serovpe Samvelian and was consecrated on 30 June 1918 by Archbishop Taniel Hagopian. Until the early 1940s, there was a small octagonal dome on top of the church. The church was renovated between 1956 and 1957 and again in 1998. Liturgies are held every other Sunday, in turns with Saint George's church in Limassol. The church celebrates on 25 December, feast day of Saint Stephen. The parish priest (as of 1992) is Fr. Mashdots Ashkarian. To the left and the right of the entrance, there are two marble inscriptions in Armenian: to the left, the inscription reads:

Կառուցաւ մատուռս Յամի Տեառն 1909 (This chapel was constructed in the Lord's Year 1909)

and to the right, the inscription reads:

Նորոգեցաւ մատուռս Յամի Տեառն 1998 (This chapel was renovated in the Lord's Year 1998)

Many of the church's icons are the work of Lebanese-Armenian painter Fr. Hovsep Ashkarian.

=== Limassol ===
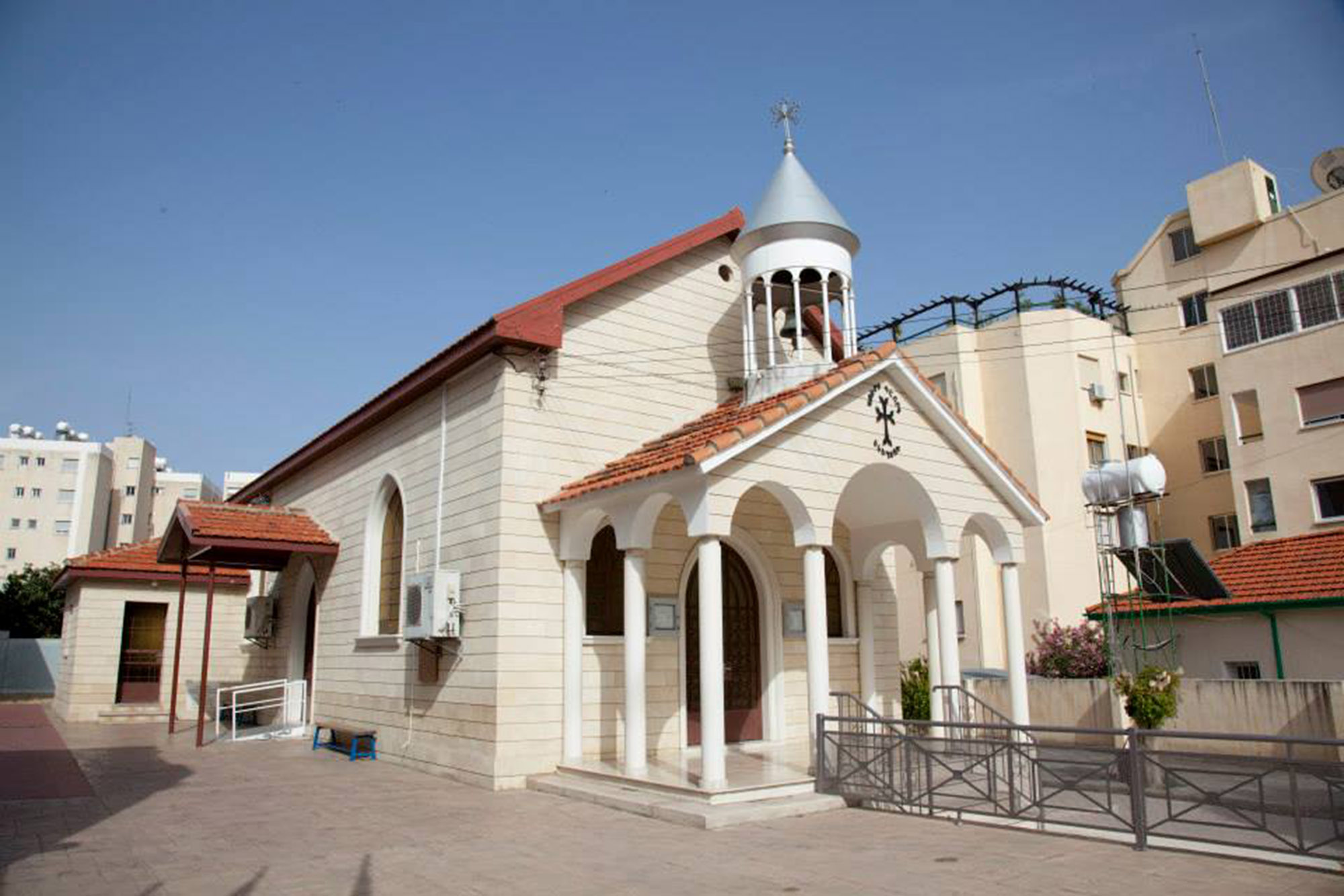
The church of Sourp Kevork in Limassol

The Sourp Kevork Church, was built on Vassilis Michaelides Street near the city centre, on land donated c. 1935 by Satenig Soultanian, in memory of her father-in-law, Kevork. As the small Armenian community of Limassol could not afford to build a church, a theatre company was formed under Ardashes Bastadjian, giving performances in Nicosia, Larnaca and Limassol. Together with a contribution by the Armenian Prelature of Cyprus and Stepan Kavafian, the church was built between 1939 and 1940, while its consecration took place on 11 April 1948 by Bishop Ghevont Chebeyian. The church was renovated between 1975 and 1976, in 2007 and again in 2015, while in 1989 its bell was made electronic by donation of brothers Garabed and Nshan Arakchindjian. Liturgies are held every other Sunday, in turns with the Sourp Stepanos Church in Larnaca. The church celebrates the feast day of Saint George on the last Sunday of September. The parish priest (as of 1992) is Friar Mashdots Ashkarian. During the 1975–1976 renovation, the belltower was placed on top of the entrance, while an iron Armenian cross was added during the 2006 renovation, with the inscription in Armenian reading:

Սուրբ Գէորգ եկեղեցի (Saint George's church)

On the lower part of the wall outside the repository, where the belltower used to be, there is another marble inscription in Armenian. It reads:

Նուիրեցաւ ելեկտրական կոչնակս արդեամբ եւ ծախիւք եղբարցն Կարապետ եւ Նշան Արագչինճեանոց Տիգրանակերտցի ի թուին Քս.ի 1989-ի (This electric rattle was offered by commission and expenses of brothers Garabed and Nshan Arakchindjian from Dikranagerd in the year of Christ 1989)

In front of the church is a dark brown tuff stone khachkar (cross-stone), donated by the Arakelyan family; it was unveiled by Archbishop Varoujan Hergelian on 28 September 2008. Next to the church is the Limassol Armenian school.

=== Northern Cyprus ===
==== Nicosia ====
The Notre Dame de Tyre on Victoria street, in North Nicosia, was originally a Benedictine/Carthusian Abbey built between 1308 and 1310, on the site of an older church which had originally been built in 1116 and was destroyed by an earthquake in 1303, where Armenian Catholic nuns served. Sometime before 1504 it passed into the hands of the Armenian Prelature of Cyprus and it used to be the centre of the Armenian community of Cyprus until it was captured, along with the rest of the Armenian quarter, by Turkish Cypriots during the 1963–1964 troubles and occupied by Turkey during the 1974 Turkish invasion. After the Osmanian occupation of Cyprus in 1570, it was temporarily used as a salt store, until it was returned to the Armenian community by a firman in May 1571; the Armenian ownership of the church was further confirmed by another firman in May 1614. During the period of the Armenian genocide, many persecuted Armenian refugees sought shelter on its verandah. It was located next to the old prelature building, the Melikian-Ouzounian school, the Armenian genocide monument and the Melikian family mansion.

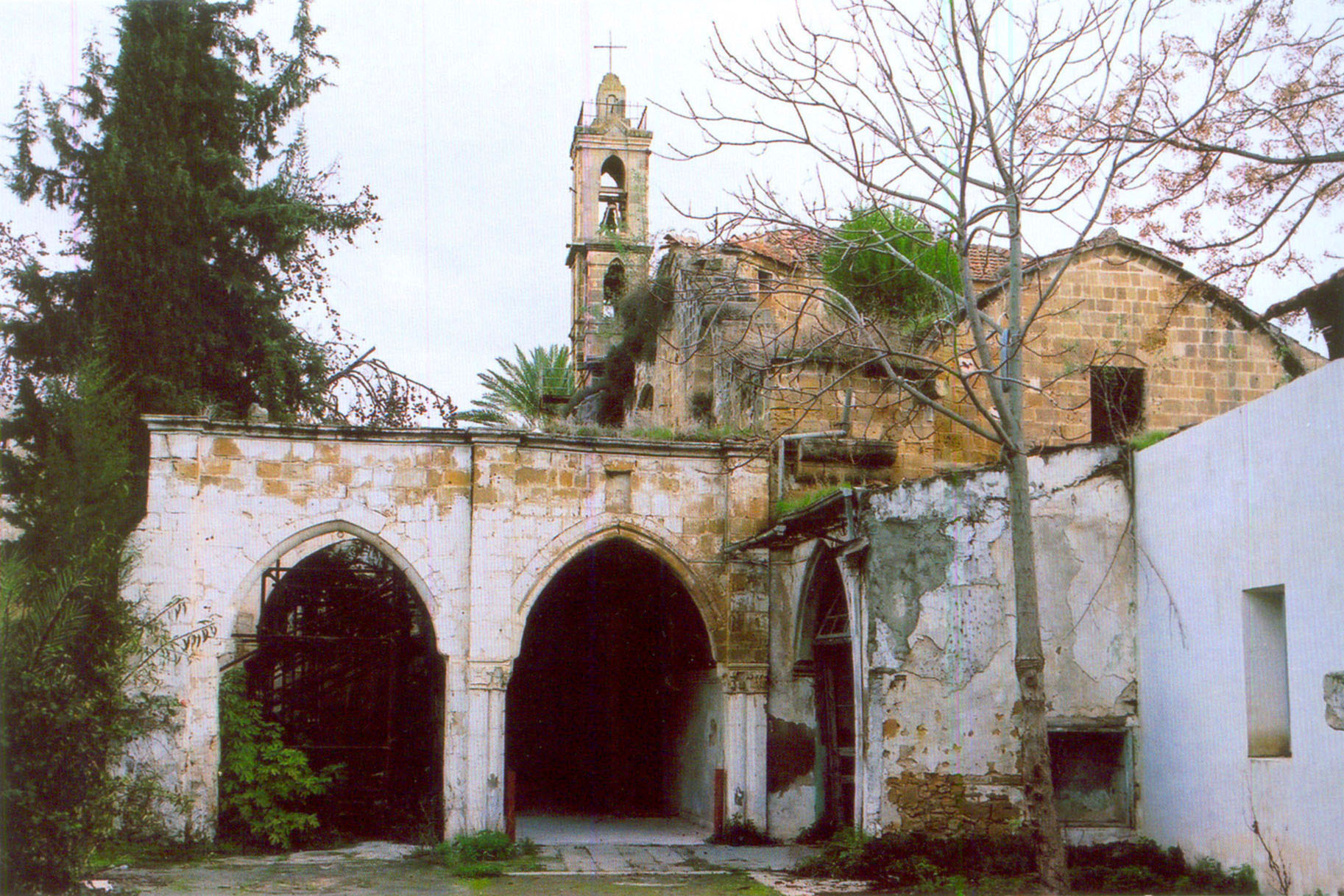
The Notre Dame de Tyre in old Nicosia prior to its restoration

During the centuries it served the small yet prosperous Armenian community of Nicosia, the church underwent various modifications: in 1688 it was renovated, in 1788 the baptistery was constructed, in 1858 the arches of the northern verandah were built, in 1860 the belfry was constructed – amongst the first in Ottoman Cyprus, a donation by Hapetig Nevrouzian of Constantinople – in 1884 it was restored, in 1904 the roof was re-built and a renovation took place, in 1945 the upper tier was erected for the choir (by donation of Aram Ouzounian), in 1950 the belfry was restored, while in 1960–1961 the Antiquities Department installed a new floor – after removing the mediaeval tombstones that were previously covered by the carpets. The church celebrated the feast day of the Presentation of Mary on the nearest Sunday to 21 November.

After its occupation in January 1964, it was used as barracks for the Turkish Cypriot militia, while after its occupation by the Turkish army in July 1974 it continued to be used as barracks for Turkish soldiers, until it suffered further damages by an earthquake in 1998. The site was abandoned and Anatolian settlers inhabited the place until late 2006.

In 2005, the United Nations Development Programme (UNDP) carried out a preliminary study for the potential restoration of the entire compound, and in 2007 it conducted a feasibility study. Heavily desecrated, its restoration started in October 2009 on the initiative of the Armenian Ethnarchy of Cyprus and the Armenian Representative, Vartkes Mahdessian. The work was carried out by the UNDP-ACT, with partial funding from the United States Agency for International Development, and was completed in November 2012.

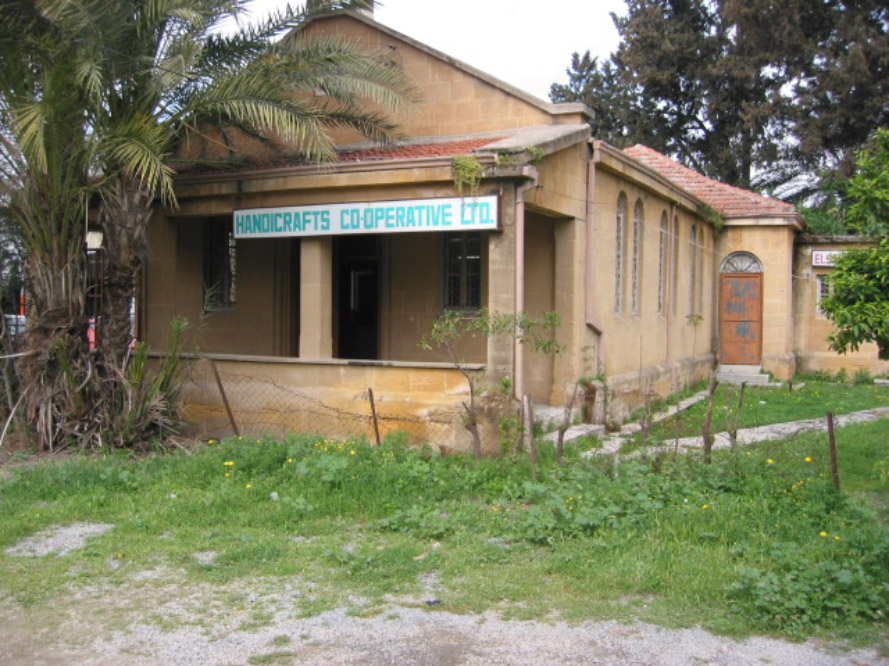
The old Armenian Evangelical church in old Nicosia

There was also a small Armenian Evangelical church, located in Mahmoud Pasha street, in the Turkish-occupied part of the walled city of Nicosia – behind the old American Academy building, near the Arab Ahmet Mosque. Prior to its erection, Armenian Evangelicals used to worship at the Reformed Presbyterian church on Apostolos Varnavas Street, opposite the old Powerhouse and behind the building of the Holy Archbishopric of Cyprus. The church –planned since the early 1930s– was eventually built due to the initiative of pastor Yohanna Der Megerditchian, with the financial contribution of the Reformed Presbyterian Church and the Armenian Evangelical faithful; its architect was Dickran H. Davidian. Its foundation stone was laid on 28 July 1946 by pastor Yohanna der Megerditchian, who dedicated it on 1 July 1947. On the lower part of the right wall to the side of the entrance there is the following inscription in Armenian:

Էփեսացիս Բ:20 - 28 Յուլիս 1946 Նիկոսիա (Ephesians 2:20–28 July 1946 Nicosia)

The church was renovated in 1955, the year when the border fence and the gate were erected; in 1959 a kitchen was added. During the 1963–1964 intercommunal troubles, the church was taken over by Turkish Cypriots. Between 1964 and 1974, the church and the surrounding buildings were used as a school for some time and then as the main military headquarters (sancaktarlık). After that, the buildings remained empty. From 1987 to 1997 the church was used as a Turkish folk music centre and then as Handicrafts Co-Operative from 1997 to 2011; as of 2011 it is used as a music centre. As with the Notre Dame de Tyre, no Services have been held since 1964.

==== Famagusta ====
The Ganchvor Monastery was probably built in 1346 by Armenian refugees who escaped the Mamluk attacks against Ayas of Cilicia. It is located between Kışla and Server Somuncuoğlu streets, in the north-western part of the walled city of Famagusta (next to the Carmelite church) and it is believed it was a part of an important monastic, cultural and theological establishment, at which Nerses of Lambron is said to have studied, and whose foundations survived until the mid-20th century. A scriptorium used to operate in the monastery, manuscripts of which survive at the Armenian Cathedral of Saint James in Jerusalem.

It is unknown when exactly it ceased being used, however it possibly stopped operating already since the mid-Venetian era. Up until at least 1862, there was a small bell-tower. Unused for more than three and a half centuries, because of Ottoman restrictions, in 1907 it was declared an ancient monument, based on Colonial Antiquities' Law IV/1905. In the same year, it was repaired by the Antiquities Department, as it was in 1931. In 1932 it was restored, also by the Antiquities Department, which significantly repaired it between 1937 and 1944 (under the care of Theophilus Mogabgab, Director of Antiquities for Famagusta District), after it was leased to the Armenian Prelature of Cyprus on 7 March 1936, for a period of 99 years – which was achieved after the intervention of Co-adjutor Catholicos of Cilicia, Papken Gulesserian, who had visited the church in 1934, and Archbishop Bedros Saradjian.

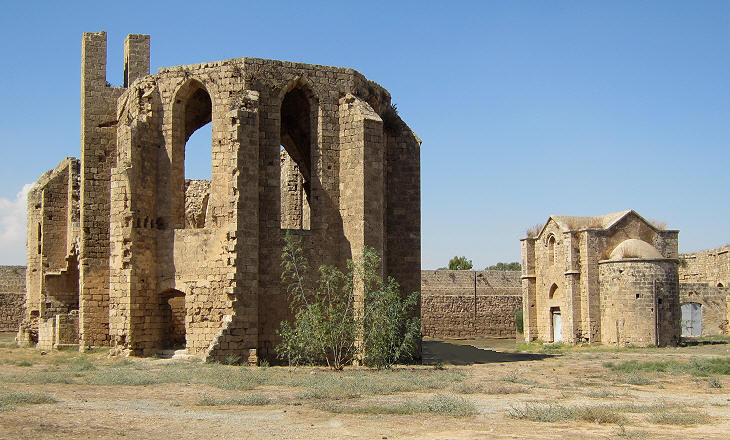
The Carmelite church and Ganchvor church

The first liturgy and its re-consecration were held on 14 January 1945 by Archimandrite Krikor Bahlavouni (also known as "Topal Vartabed"). On 8 March 1957 it was partially burnt by Turkish Cypriots, but continued to be used as a church until 1962; since then, the Famagusta Armenian community used the church of Ayia Paraskevi, which the Holy Archbishopric of Cyprus granted. The church celebrated the feast day of the Dormition of the Mother of God on the nearest Sunday to 15 August. In January 1964 it was taken by Turkish Cypriots during the 1963–1964 troubles and was occupied by Turkey in August 1974 during the 1974 Turkish invasion. Between 1964 and 1974, it was used as a residence, despite attempts by the Swedish Contingent of United Nations Peacekeeping Force in Cyprus and others to make other arrangements for the residing family. After 1974it was used as a stable and a store room until 2005 when it was declassified from a "military area". Until 1974, there were frescoes on the walls, which have since disappeared. It has been left to the mercy of nature and vandals and it is in need of repairs. No liturgies have been held since 1964.

==== Halevga ====
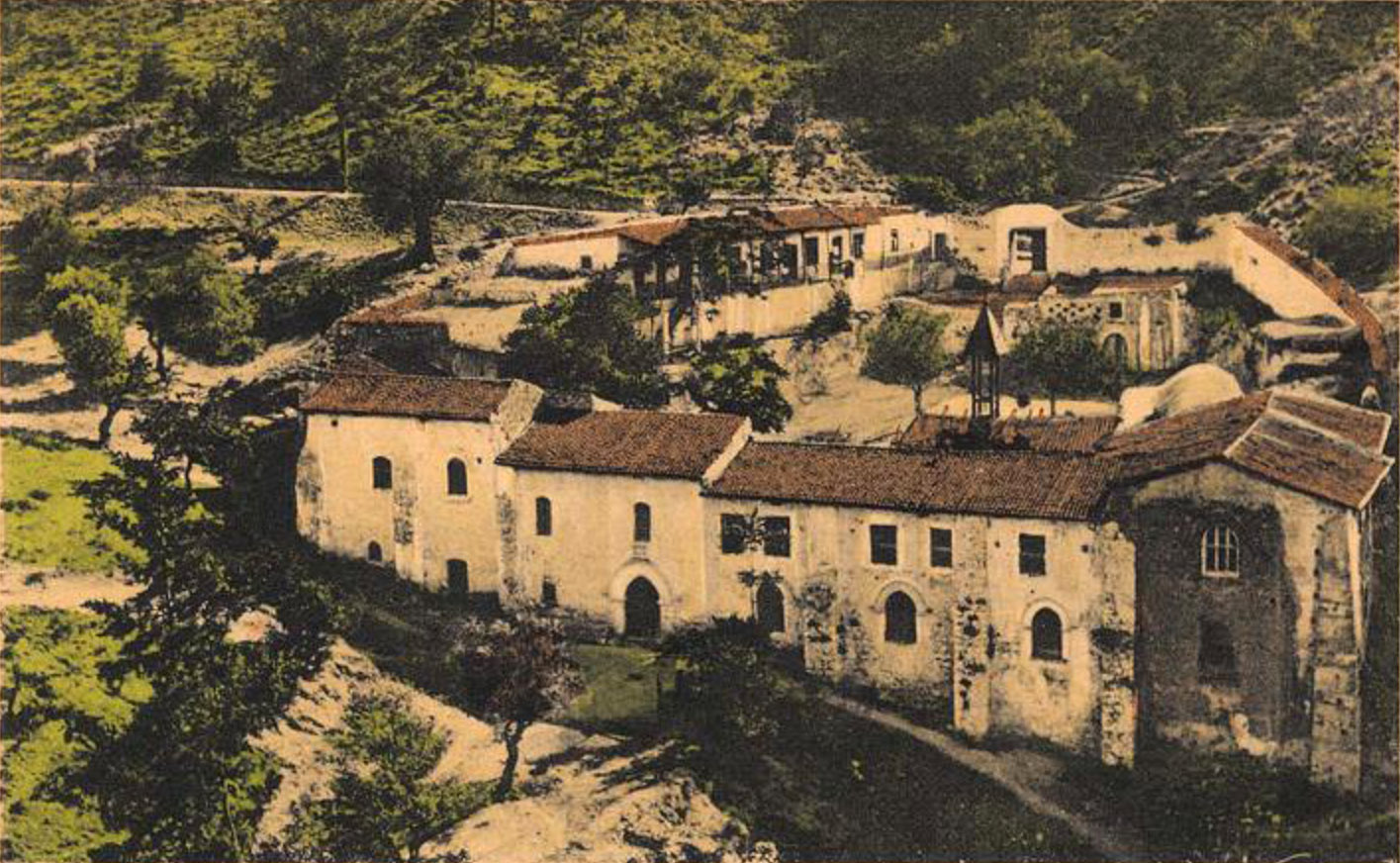
Panoramic view of the Sourp Magar Monastery (1926)

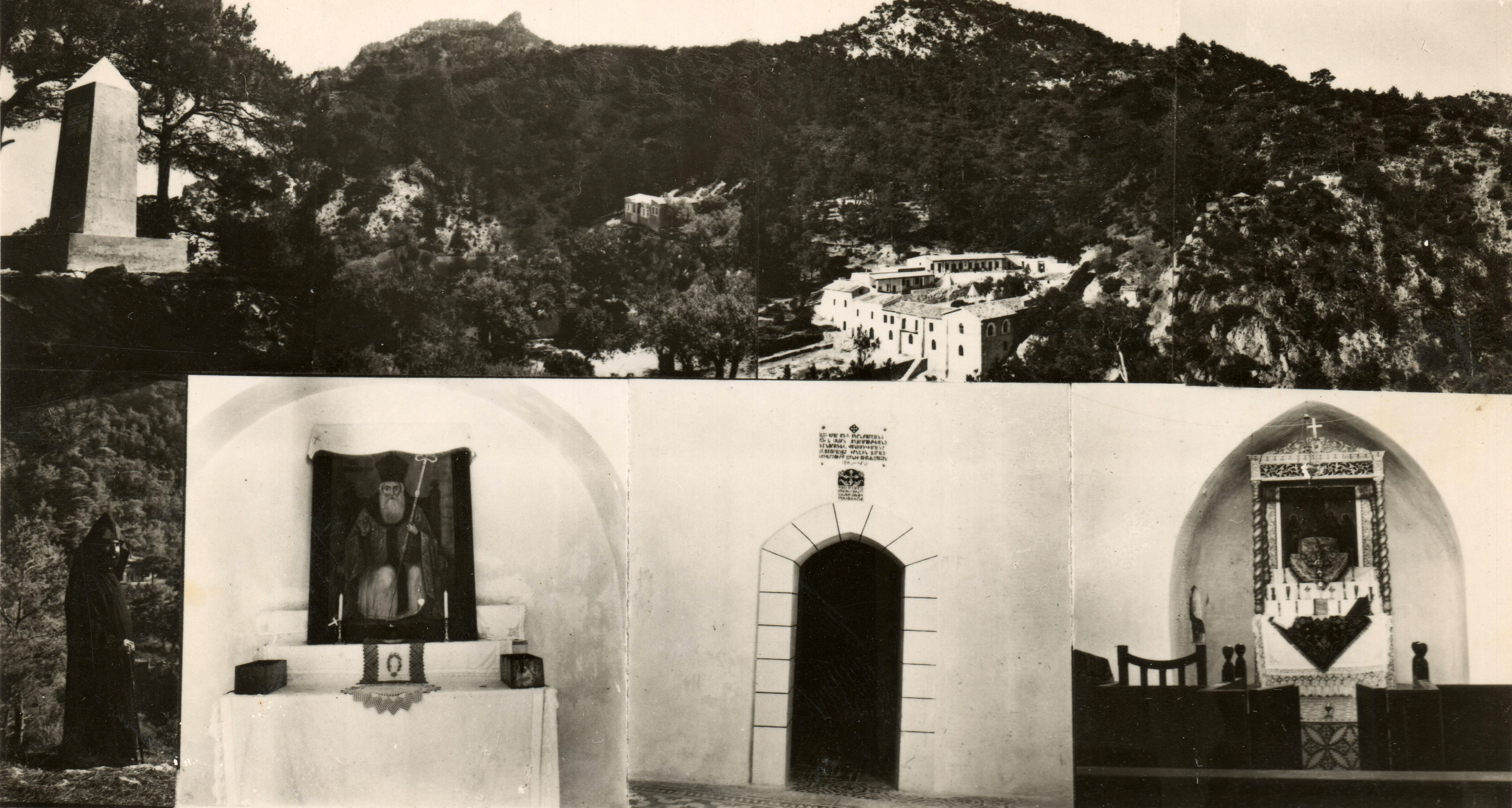
Multiple views of the Sourp Magar Monastery's interior and exterior (1940s)

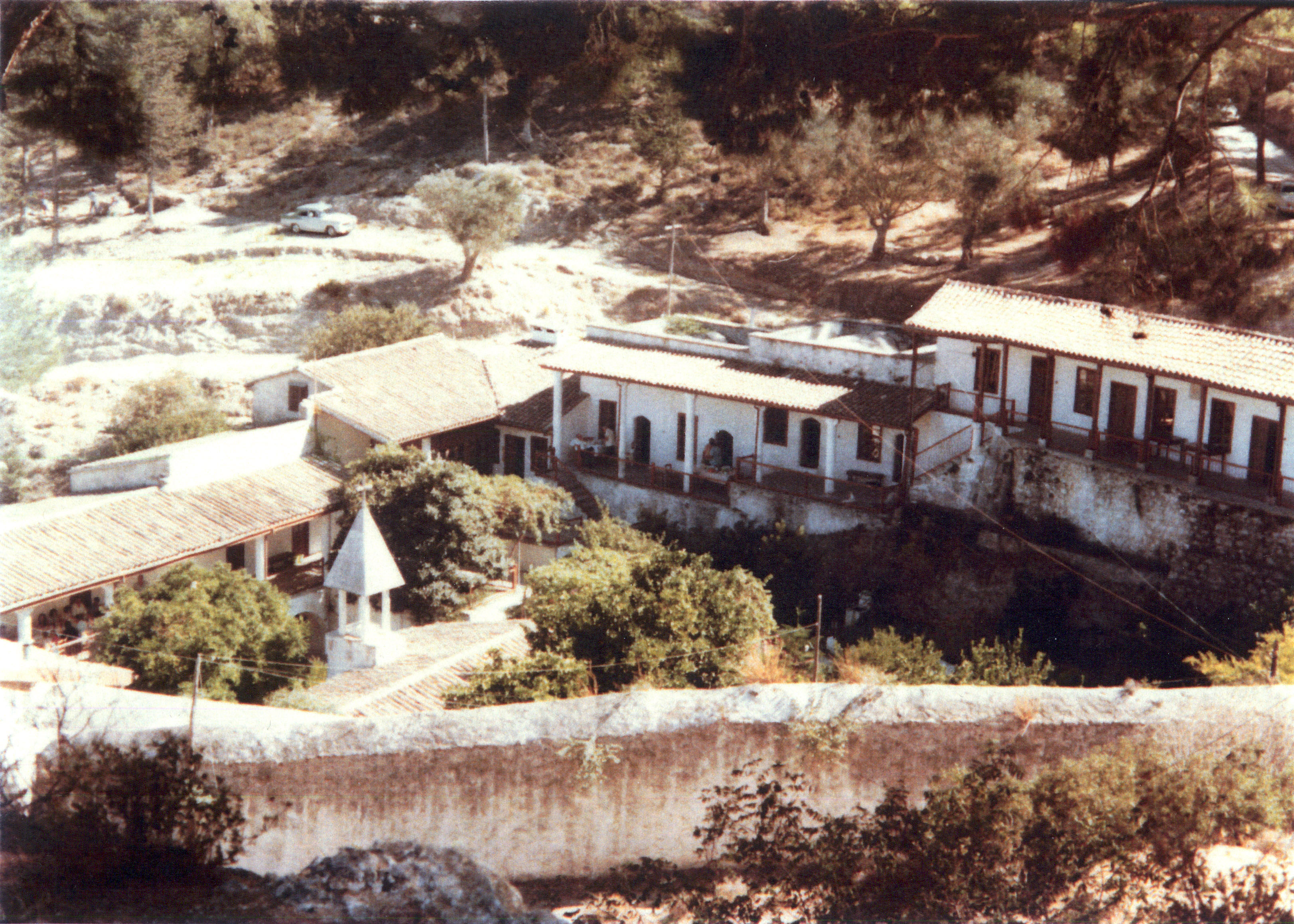
The interior of the Sourp Magar Monastery in 1970

The Sourp Magar Monastery is located within the Plataniotissa forest near Halevga, in the Kyrenia Mountains at a height of 530 m (1,740 ft). Its vast land (about 8,500 donums), extending up to the coast, included around 30,000 olive and carob trees, whose exploitation was the main source of income for the Armenian Prelature of Cyprus until 1974. The monastery was originally established by Copts c. 1000 at a location in which Saint Macarius is said to have been an ascetic; his icon was believed to be miraculous and, until the early 20th century, the Armenian residents of the region – some of whom had found shelter after the Hamidian massacres (1894–1897) – believed they could hear the Saint galloping with his horse at night.

The monastery passed into the hands of the Armenians sometime before 1425. During the Latin era, its monks were known for their strict diet, while during the Ottoman era it was known as the Blue Monastery, from the colour of its doors and window blinds. For centuries, it had been a popular place of pilgrimage for Armenians and non-Armenians alike, a way station for pilgrims en route to the Holy Land, as well as a place of recuperation and rest for Armenian Catholicoi and clergymen from Cilicia and Jerusalem (it was the favourite holiday resort for Catholicos Sahag II, who used to ride his horse around its vast lands). Amongst its guests was Abbot Mkhitar Sebastatsi, who spent some time there in 1695 on his way to Rome, as well as Tserents, who – inspired by the visible outline of the distant Taurus Mountains, in 1875 – wrote the historical novel Toros Levoni, set in the times of the Armenian Kingdom of Cilicia; according to tradition, in 1140 prince Thoros II took refuge here to escape from his persecutors.

The monastery won the favour of the Ottomans; a 1642 firman exempted Armenians from paying taxes for the monastery, whose terms were renewed in 1660 and 1701. The 1650–1750 period is considered its "golden century", as huge areas of land were purchased or given to the monastery. A large-scale renovation took place between 1734 and 1735 by Archimandrite Haroutiun, while between 1811 and 1818 Symeon Agha of Crimea financed a complete restoration and built the present chapel of the monastery. The initial chapel, at the centre of the monastic compound, was destroyed by earthquakes and natural conditions; the present chapel, next to the original one, was inaugurated on 3 January 1814. Renovations and restorations took place also in 1866 (by commission of the Armenian Patriarch of Constantinople Boghos Taktakian), in 1926 (by commission of Dickran Ouzounian, Ashod Aslanian and Garo Balian), in 1929 (by commission of Boghos and Anna Magarian), between 1947 and 1949 (by commission of Hovhannes and Mary Shakarian) and again in 1973 (by initiative of the Armenian Ethnarchy of Cyprus). The road linking the monastery to Halevga was constructed in 1926 and 1927, by commission of Agha Garabed Melkonian, while the square, to the east of the monastery, was constructed in 1933 by commission of Catholicos Sahag II.

For centuries, the monastery had been an important spiritual centre. Until the early 20th century, a large number of exquisite and priceless manuscripts written at the monastery's scriptorium between 1202 and 1740, as well as numerous valuable ecclesiastical vessels, were kept here, before they were moved to Nicosia for safe-keeping; since 1947, 56 illuminated manuscripts are at the Catholicosate of Cilicia in Antelias. It appears that the last monks lived there permanently until about 1800. There are two monuments in the vicinity: a commemorative stone column at the square of the monastery, unveiled on 8 September 1933 by Catholicos Sahag II, and a mortar obelisk dedicated to Abbot Mkhitar, on top of the namesake hill to the north-west of the monastery, unveiled on 2 August 1931 by Catholicos Sahag II and Archbishop Bedros Saradjian.

Between 1897 and 1904, Vahan Kurkjian's National Educational Orphanage had its summer sessions here, as did – for the whole year – a small Armenian school for the children of the region until 1914. The area was used as a summer resort and camping site for Armenian scouts and students. In 1948 the Archangels' fountain was erected, by commission of Kapriel and Arshalouis Kasbarian, which was officially blessed by Bishop Ghevont Chebeyan on 2 May 1948. In 1949 Sarkis and Sourpig Marashlian funded the water distribution network, the turbine and the electric generator. The monastery's chapel was a favourite place for Christenings. A new baptistery was constructed in 1968 by Karnig Kouyoumdjian. Until 1974, a large number of Armenian Cypriot families rented rooms in the monastery during the weekends and holidays. On May's first weekend, Saint Macarius’ feast, many Armenian-Cypriots would visit the Sourp Magar Monastery and some of them would rent rooms and help in the preparation of the harissa (chicken porridge). On Sunday, a liturgy was held at the chapel of the monastery and harissa was served afterwards.

The monastery was captured by the Turkish troops in August 1974, who later used it to house settlers from Anatolia and, in the 1980s, to house military officers. It has since been abandoned and is today in a dilapidated state. Between 1998 and 1999 and again in 2005, it was turned it into a hotel; after co-ordinated reactions, was reverted. In December 2006 and in July 2008, it was visited by Hrant Dink and Catholicos Aram I, respectively. By initiative of Representative Vartkes Mahdessian and the Armenian Ethnarchy, on 6 May 2007 the first visit-pilgrimage took place there after 33 years; it was repeated on 10 May 2009, 9 May 2010, 8 May 2011, 13 May 2012 and 19 May 2013, with the participation of a large number of Armenian-Cypriots and other Armenians, some of whom came from abroad.

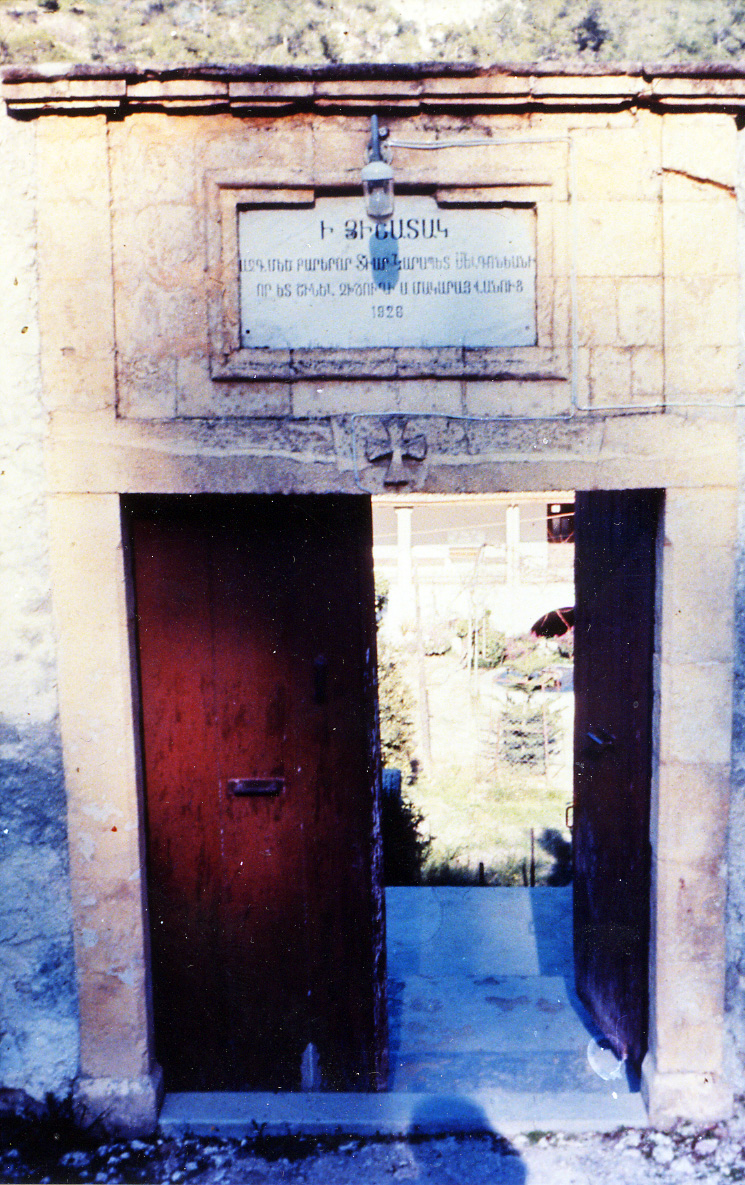
The entrance to the Sourp Magar Monastery

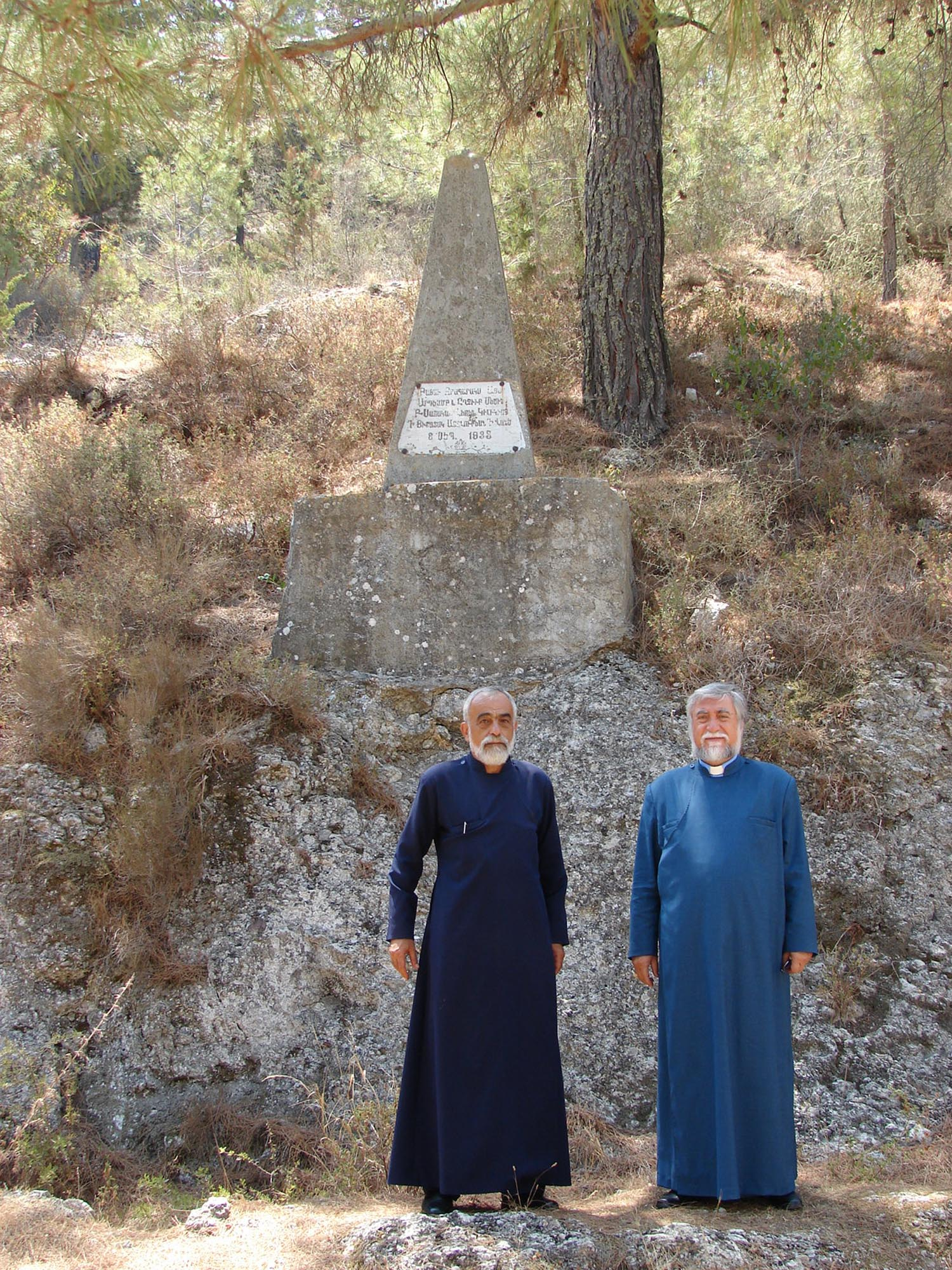
Catholicos Aram I and Archbishop Varoujan in front of Sahag's monument

On top of the entrance gate of the monastery there used to be the following commemorative marble inscription in Armenian:

Ի յիշատակ ազգ. մեծ բարերար Տիար Կարապետ Մելգոնեանի որ ետ շինել զխճուղի Ս. Մակարայ Վանուց 1926 (In memory of great national benefactor Mr Garabed Melkonian who re-built the macadam road of Sourp Magar's monastery 1926)

Between the entrance and the chapel, on a wall to the left and above the monastery's turbine and generator, there is the following commemorative marble inscription in Armenian, the only one surviving within the monastery premises, even though it has been partially defaced:

Շինեցաւ կազմածք ջրաբաշխութեան եւ լուսաւորութեան Ս. Մակարայ Վանուց սրտաբուխ նուիրատուութեամբ Տէր եւ Տիկին Սարգիս Մարաշլեանի 1949 (The equipments of water and light distribution of Saint Macarius' monastery were built by the generous donation of Mr and Mrs Sarkis Marashlian 1949)

In front of the iron gate to the chapel there used to be the following commemorative marble inscriptions in Armenian:

Շինեցաւ զանգակատուն եւ յատակ մատրանս՝ արդեամբ Տիար Կարօ Պալեանի 1926 (The belfry and floor of the chapel were built by commission of Mr Garo Balian 1926)

Շինեցաւ դասս, գաւիթ մատրանս, արդեամբ Տիար Տիգրան Ուզունեանի 1926 (The soleas [and] narthex of this chapel were built by commission of Mr Dickran Ouzounian 1926)

In front of the chapel's door there used to be the following commemorative marble inscription in Armenian:

Վերանորոգեցաւ մատուռս սրտաբուխ ծախիւք Տէր եւ Տիկին Յովհաննէս Շաքարեանի ի յիշատակ ննջեցելոց իւրեանց 1947 (This chapel was restored by the generous expenses of Mr and Mrs Hovhannes Shakarian in memory of their deceased 1947)

On top of the chapel's door there used to be the following commemorative marble inscriptions in Armenian:

Վերստին նորոգեցի Սուրբ Անապատս Մեծի Մակարայ Ճգնաւորին ձեռամբ Յարութիւն Վարդապետի: Ի թուին ՌՃՁԴ 1735 [The Holy Hermitage of Macarius the Great was renovated again by the hands of Archimandrite Haroutiun. In the year 1184 (according to the old Armenian dating system) 1735 (according to the global dating system)]

Այց արար մէզ Տէրն Բարձանց, Աստուած եւ Հայրն Ողորմութեանց, ետ նորոգել Վանքս ի հիմանց, յըստորակաց Փրկչին ամաց: Հոգաբարձութբ. ազնիւ Սիմէօն Աղային 1814 Յունվ. 3: (The Lord of the Heavens visited us, the God and Father of Mercy, this Monastery was renovated again from its foundations, by His subordinate in the Saviour's years. Under the direction of the noble Symeon Agha, 3 January 1814.)

In front of the repository there used to be the following commemorative marble inscriptions in Armenian:

Տիար Աշոտ Ասլանեան մասնակցեցաւ աւանդատան նորոգման 1926 (Mr Ashod Aslanian participated in the renovation of the repository 1926)

Under the baptistery there used to be the following commemorative marble inscription in Armenian:

Շինեցւ աւազանս մկրտութեան արդեամբ եւ ծախիւք Գառնիկ Մկրտիչ Գույոումճեանի ի յիշատակ ննջեցելոց իւրոյ 1968 (This baptistery was built by commission and expenses of Karnig Mgrditch Kouyoumdjian in memory of his deceased 1968)

In front of the dorter there used to be the following commemorative marble inscription in Armenian:

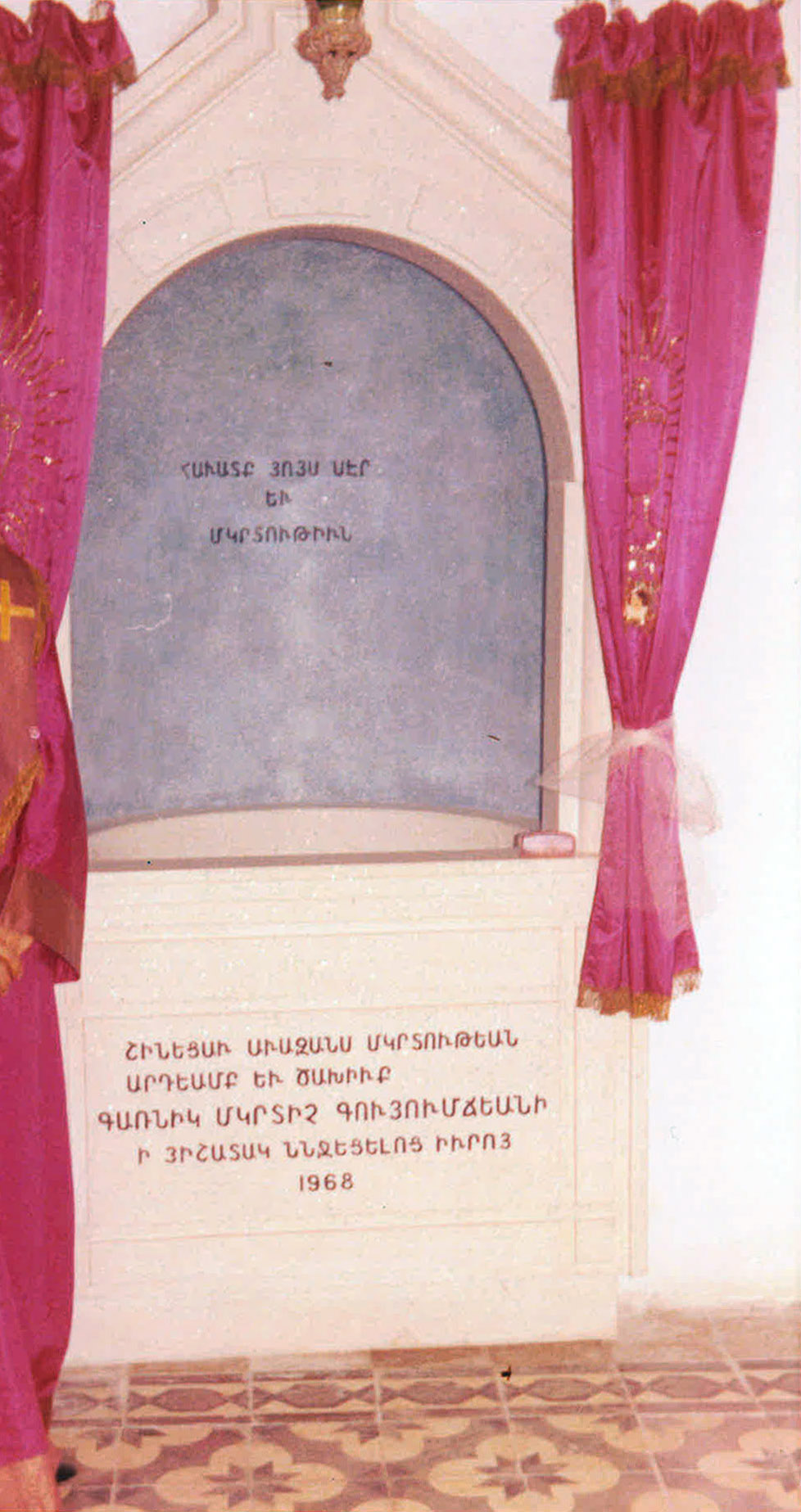
The Sourp Magar Monastery's baptistery

Նորոգեցաւ դարպասս արդեամբ Տէր եւ Տիկին Պօղոս եւ Աննա Մակարեանի 1929 (This dorter was renovated by commission of Mr and Mrs Boghos and Anna Magarian 1929)

Շինեցաւ գաւիթ սբյ. տաճարիս արդեամբք բարեսէր Խրմցի մհտսի. Սիմէօն Աղային ի յշտկ. հոգւոյ կենակցւոյն իւրոյ ի Տր. հանգուցեալ Աննայ հոգեսէր Խաթունին դստեր Սարգիս Աղային. Ընթերցողքըդ տուք զողորմիս. Ամէն յամի Տռն. 1818 (The narthex of this holy temple was built by commission of benevolent mahdessi (a person gone on pilgrimage to Jerusalem) Agha Symeon of Crimea in memory of the soul of his deceased companion who rests besides the Lord the devout Anna Khatoun, daughter of Sarkis Agha. You the readers give me your mercy. Amen in the Lord's Year 1818)

In front of the two Moughalian rooms there used to be the following commemorative marble inscription in Armenian:

Երկոքին սենեակս շինեցան արդեամբք ժառանգորդաց Արթին Աղա Մուղալեանի 1907 (Both these rooms were built by commission of the heirs of Artin Agha Moughalian 1907)

In front of the other rooms there used to be the following commemorative marble inscription in Armenian:

Արար ըզսոյն իւր յիշատակ Ս. Մակարայ Վանիցս սենեակ արգոյ Հաճի Սիմէօն Աղային ընդ ամուսնոյն Խաթուն Աննայն 1814 Յունվ. 3 (These rooms in Saint Macarius Monastery were built by Hadji Symeon Agha for the precious memory of his wife Khatoun Anna 3 January 1814)

On the rooms of the mills there is the following commemorative marble inscription in Armenian:

Շինեցաւ ի յիշատակ նուիրատուացն աղօրեաց Տ. Տ. Յովսէփայ եւ Մարտիրոսի Վարդապետացն, 1922 (Built in memory of the mills' donors Archimandrites Hovsep and Mardiros, 1922)

Finally, on the Holy Archangels' fountain, there used to be the following commemorative marble inscription in Armenian, which is now partially defaced:

Գտաւ ակնաղբիւրս այս Սրբոց Հրեշտակապետաց սրտաբուխ նուիրատուութեամբ Տէր եւ Տիկին Գասպարեանի 1948 (This fountain-head of the Holy Archangels was found by the generous donation of Mr and Mrs Kasparian 1948)

== See also ==
- Armenia–Cyprus relations

== Useful Bibliography ==
=== Books ===
- Բակուրան: Կիպրոս կղզի, Աշխարհագրական եւ պատմական տեսութիւն, Հայ Գաղթականութիւն (Տպարան Ազգային Կրթարան-Որբանոցի, Նիկոսիա: 1903).
- ԲԱԿ: Հայ Կիպրոս, Հայ գաղութը եւ Ս. Մակար (Տպարան Դպրեվանույ Կաթողիկոսութեան Կիլիկիոյ, Անթիլիաս: 1936).
- Ղեւոնդ Եպիսկուոս: Յիշատակարան Կիպրահայ գաղութի (Տպարան Դպրեվանույ Կաթողիկոսութեան Կիլիկիոյ, Անթիլիաս: 1955).
- Առաջնորդարան Հայոց Կիպրոսի: Յիշատակի գիրք Նիկոսիոյ Ս. Աստուածածին եկեղեցւոյ նաւակատիքին եւ օծման (Նիկոսիա: 1981).
- Եղիշէ Ծ. Վրդ. Մանճիկեան: Ն.Ս.Օ.Տ.Տ. Արամ Ա. Կաթողիկոսին Մեծի Տանն Կիլիկիոյ հովուապետական անդրանիկ այցելութիւնը Կիպրոսի Հայոց Թեմին: 13–20 Դեկտեմբեր 1995 (Տպարան Կաթողիկոսութեան Հայոց Մեծի Տանն Կիլիկիոյ, Անթիլիաս: 1996).
- Susan Paul Pattie: Faith in History, Armenians rebuilding community (Smithsonian Institution Press, Washington: 1997).
- Γραφείο Προεδρικού Επιτρόπου: Επιζώντες θησαυροί από τη Μονή Αγίου Μακαρίου (Αρμενομονάστηρο) (Γραφείο Προεδρικού Επιτρόπου, Λευκωσία: 2000).
- Αρμενική Μητρόπολη Κύπρου: 1700 χρόνια Χριστιανισμού στην Αρμενία (Λευκωσία: 2001).
- Χρίστος Ιακώβου, Μαρία Μετέ & Βαχάν Αϊνετζιάν: Αρμένιοι της Κύπρου, ΧΡΟΝΙΚΟ with "Politis" newspaper (Issue 48, 21 April 2008).
- Armenian Prelature of Cyprus: Η Αρμενική Εκκλησία στην Κύπρο/Հայաստանեայց Եկեղեցի Կիպրոսի մէջ/The Armenian Church in Cyprus (Nicosia: 2003).
- Αχιλλέας Κ. Αιμιλιανίδης: Το καθεστώς της Αρμενικής Εκκλησίας της Κύπρου (Power Publishing, Λευκωσία: 2006).
- Αλέξανδρος-Μιχαήλ Χατζηλύρας: Οι Αρμένιοι της Κύπρου, ΧΡΟΝΙΚΟ with "Politis" newspaper (Issue 30, 14 September 2008).
- Alexander-Michael Hadjilyra: The Armenians of Cyprus (Kalaydjian Foundation, Larnaca: 2009).
- Αλέξανδρος-Μιχαήλ Χατζηλύρας: Οι Αρμένιοι της Κύπρου (Ίδρυμα Καλαϊτζιάν, Λάρνακα: 2009).
- John Matossian: Silent partners, the Armenians and Cyprus 578–1878 (Lusignan Press, Nicosia: 2009).
- Andrekos Varnava, Nicholas Courea and Marina Elia (Eds): The minorities of Cyprus, development patterns and the identity of the internal-exclusion (Cambridge Scholars Publishing, Newcastle: 2009).
- Αλέξανδρος-Μιχαήλ Χατζηλύρας: Οι Αρμένιοι της Κύπρου (Ίδρυμα Καλαϊτζιάν, Λάρνακα: 2009).
- Վարուժան Արքեպիսկոպոս: Ատանայի վկաները եւ Սուրբ Ստեփանոս վկայարանը, 1909, Լառնագա (Նիկոսիա: 2010).
- Վարուժան Արքեպիսկոպոս: Թղթակցութիւն Սակահ Բ. Կաթողիկոսի եւ Պետրոս Արք. Սարաճեանի (Նիկոսիա: 2011).
- Վարուժան Արքեպիսկոպոս: Կիպրոսի Թեմի հովուական կարգը եւ Թեմական կազմաւորութիւնը (Նիկոսիա: 2011)
- Αλέξανδρος-Μιχαήλ Χατζηλύρας: Η Κυπριακή Δημοκρατία και οι Θρησκευτικές Ομάδες (Λευκωσία: 2012).
- Alexander-Michael Hadjilyra: The Armenians of Cyprus (Press and Information Office, Nicosia: 2012).
- Αλέξανδρος-Μιχαήλ Χατζηλύρας: Οι Αρμένιοι της Κύπρου (Γραφείο Τύπου και Πληροφοριών, Λευκωσία: 2012).

=== Published articles ===
- Արշակ Ալպօյաճեան: Կիպրոս Կղզին, իր անցեալն ու ներկան [Թէոդիկի Ամէնուն Տարեցոյցը, 21րդ Տարի (1926), էջ. 192–239], Փարիզ: 1927.
- Noubar Maxoudian: An Early Colony: History of the Armenians in Cyprus [Armenian Review, Vol. XI, No. 1 (Spring 1958), p. 73–77], Watertown, Massachusetts: 1958.
- Կարօ Գէորգեան: Պատմութիւն Կիպրոսի եւ Կիպրահայ Գաղութը [Ամենուն Տարեգիրքը, Ը Տարի (1960), էջ. 333–426], Պէյրութ: 1961.
- Avedis K. Sanjian: The Diocese of Cyprus [part of Chapter VI, The Armenian Communities in Syria under Ottoman Dominion, p. 160–167], Harvard: 1965.
- Criton G. Tornaritis: The legal position of the Armenian religious group (1961) [Constitutional and legal problems of the Republic of Cyprus, p. 83–90], Nicosia: 1972.
- Noubar Maxoudian: A brief history of the Armenians in Cyprus (1936) [Armenian Review, Vol. XXVII, No. 4 (Winter 1974), p. 398–416], Watertown, Massachusetts: 1974.
- Susan Pattie: Armenian Diaspora Life in Cyprus and London [Armenian Review, Vol. XLIV, No. 1 (Spring 1991), p. 37–57], Watertown, Massachusetts: 1991.
- Gilles Grivaud: Les minorités orientales à Chypre (Époques médiévale et moderne) [Travaux de la Maison de l' Orient Méditerranéen No. 31 (1997), p. 43–70]. Lyon: 2000.
- Nicholas Coureas: Non-Chalcedonian Christians on Latin Cyprus [Dei gesta per Francos: Crusade Studies in Honour of Jean Richard, p. 349–360], Surrey: 2001.
- Kevork Keshishian: The Armenian community of Cyprus: 6th century AD to present day (1995) [ed. Ruth Keshishian; Cyprus Today, Vol. XL, No 1 (January–April 2002) p. 22–40], Nicosia: 2002.
- Charalambos K. Papastathis: Le statut légal des religions dans la République de Chypre [L’année canonique, No. XLV (2003), pp. 267–286], Paris: 2003.
- Գևորգ Քեշիշյան & Մարգարիտ Բաղդասարյան: Կիպրոս [Հայ Սփյուռք Հանրագիտարան, Էջ. 343–349], Երևան: 2003.
- Achilles Emilianides: State and Church in Cyprus [State and Church in the European Union, pp. 231–252], Baden: 2005.
- Αχιλλεύς Αιμιλιανίδης: Γνωμάτευση: Ποιοι Θεωρούνται ως Μέλη Θρησκευτικών Ομάδων σύμφωνα με το Κυπριακό Σύνταγμα, [Λυσίας, No. 1 (2006), σελ. 26-31], Λευκωσία: 2006.
- Achilles Emilianides: Religion and the State in Dialogue: Cyprus [Religion and Law in Dialogue: Covenantal and Non-Covenantal Cooperation Between State and Religion in Europe, pp. 19–31], Leuven: 2006.
- Achilles Emilianides: Il finanziamento delle cinque religioni: il caso cipriota [Quaderni di diritto e politica ecclesiastica, No. 1 (Aprile 2006), pp. 107–124], Bologna: 2006.
- Nicholas Coureas: Between the Latins and Native Tradition: The Armenians in Lusignan Cyprus, 1191–1473 [L' Église arménienne entre Grecs et Latins: fin XIe - milieu XVe siècle, p. 205–214], Montpellier: 2009.
- Αλέξανδρος-Μιχαήλ Χατζηλύρας: Η αρμενοκυπριακή κοινότητα [Ιστορία της Κυπριακής Δημοκρατίας, τόμος 3ος (1980–1989), σελ. 182–201], Λευκωσία: 2011.
- Αλέξανδρος-Μιχαήλ Χατζηλύρας: Η διαχρονική παρουσία της αρμενοκυπριακής κοινότητας [Ενατενίσεις, Νο. 14 (Μάιος–Αύγουστος 2011) σελ. 141–149], Λευκωσία: 2011.
