= Sourp Boghos chapel, Nicosia =

Armenian Apostolic chapel in Nicosia, Cyprus

Coordinates: 35.176000°N 33.354236°E

Sourp Boghos (Armenian: Սուրբ Պօղոս; Saint Paul) is an Armenian Apostolic chapel in Nicosia, Cyprus.

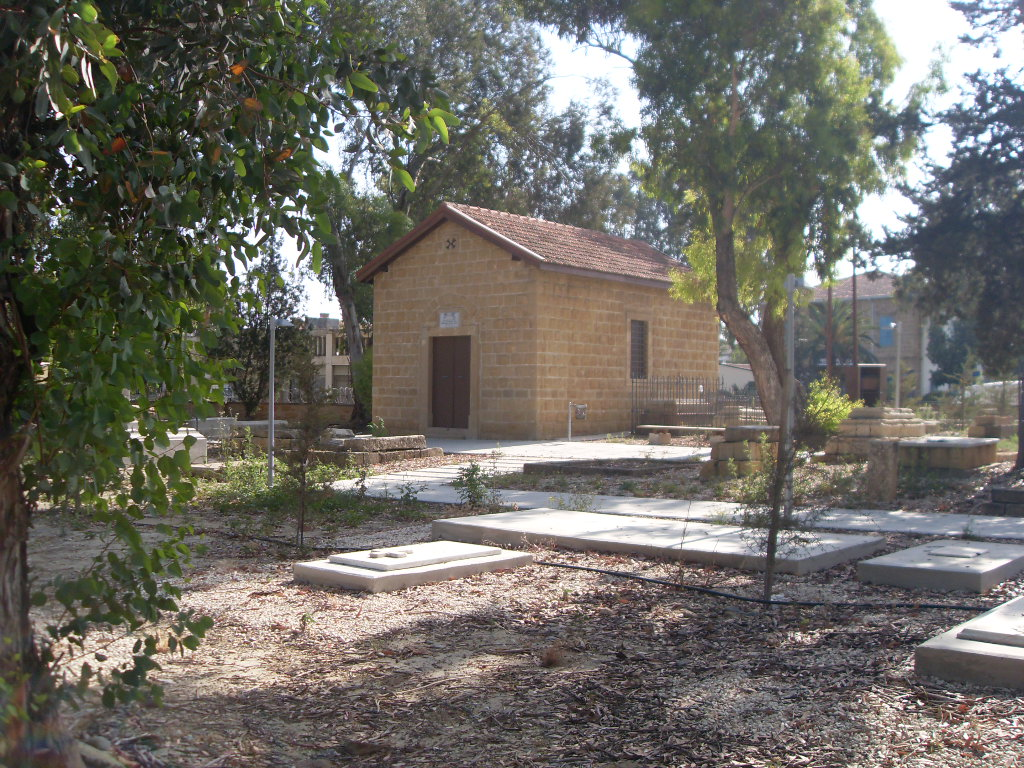
Sourp Boghos chapel in Nicosia

The chapel is located in the old Armenian cemetery near the Ledra Palace hotel, very near the Nicosia city centre, was built in 1892 by the will and testament of Boghos G. Odadjian, a translator for the British administration of Cyprus.

The cemetery was used as a burial place until 1931, when its operation was discontinued by the government for health reasons, and another Armenian cemetery started its operation to the west of Ayios Dhometios. However, until the 1963-1964 inter-communal troubles, the chapel was used a few times a year to celebrate Liturgies. Afterwards, due to the proximity with the cease-fire line, it had been neglected until it was partially restored in 1988 by initiative of Senior Archimandrite Yeghishe Mandjikian.

Between 2008 and 2009, the cemetery and its chapel were restored thanks to the initiative and efforts of Armenian MP Vartkes Mahdessian and the Armenian Ethnarchy of Cyprus, with partial funding by the Ministry of Interior. The first Liturgy since 1963 and the re-consecration of the chapel took place on 11 April 2010, celebrated by Archbishop Varoujan Hergelian. Liturgies were held until 2014.

In March 2010, a commemorative aluminium plaque was placed above a cenotaph in the cemetery, containing the names of 419 persons resting there, for whom records can be found in the Prelature’s registry.

== See also ==
- Armenians in Cyprus
- Armenian Prelature of Cyprus
