= Sourp Magar Monastery, Cyprus =

Armenian monastery in Cyprus

Coordinates: 35.2876°N 33.5220°E

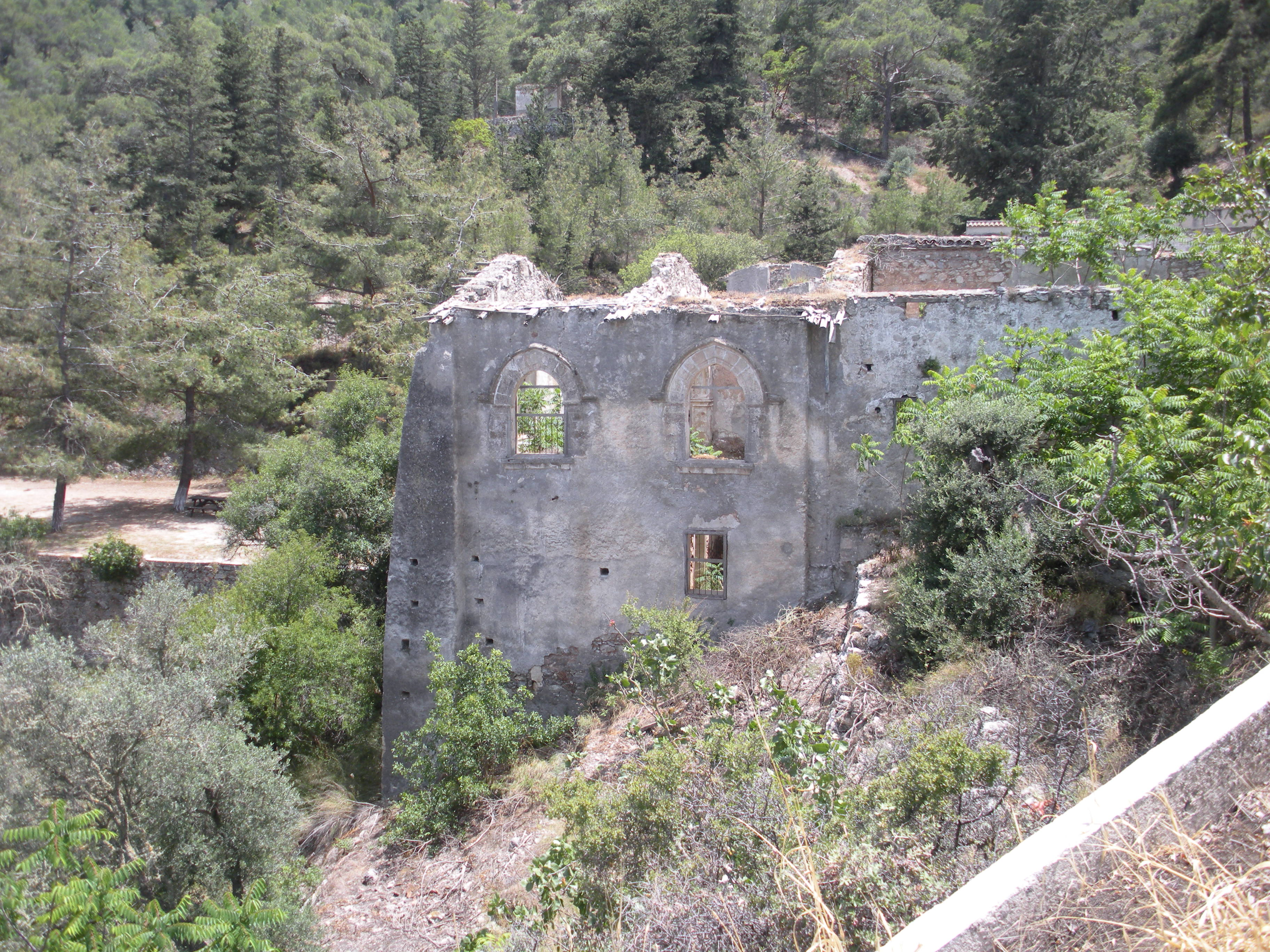
General view of Sourp Magar from the north, showing main domestic building in 2009.

Sourp Magar (Armenian: Սուրբ Մակար or Magaravank, Ս. Մակարայ Վանք) is located in the Pentadhaktylos mountain range in Cyprus, at an altitude of 530 m (1,740 ft) and about 1.5 km (0.93 mi) west of Halevga and 11 km (6.8 mi) north-east of Kythrea. It is the only Armenian monastery in Cyprus, which is celebrated on the first Sunday of May. It has been located in the occupied part of Cyprus since 1974. It is currently in a state of disrepair.

The monastery had close ties with the Armenian Catholicosate of Cilicia.

== History ==
The Magaravank was founded in the early eleventh century and at that time seems to have belonged to the Coptic Orthodox Church. It was dedicated to Macarius of Alexandria (306–395). Of the Coptic history of Sourp Magar nothing is known, but sometime before 1425 the monastery was transferred to the Armenians in Cyprus.

Armenians had long lived in Cyprus, but their numbers increased substantially after fall of the Armenian Kingdom of Cilicia in 1375 when its last King Leo V escaped the Mamelukes. The crown of the Kingdom of Armenia subsequently passed to the Lusignan rulers of Cyprus. Armenians continued to migrate to Cyprus as Turkic peoples entered Anatolia and established powerful kingdoms there in the 14th and 15th centuries. The transfer of Sourp Magar to the Armenians was probably occasioned by these events and the increasing importance of the Armenian-Cypriot community in the Lusignan Kingdom of Cyprus.

The Armenians retained control of Sourp Magar and its lands during the Venetian Era and the Ottoman Era. During the Ottoman Era, it was often called the Blue Monastery due to the colour of the doors and windows. In 1642, the monastery was exempted from taxes. This exemption was renewed in 1660 and 1701. Restoration work is recorded to have been undertaken between 1734 and 1735 and again between 1811 and 1818, when the new, larger chapels was constructed (inaugurated in 1814). Sourp Magar has served a wide range of social functions, from a school and rest-house for pilgrims to an orphanage and summer retreat for the Armenians of Nicosia. Some people lived on-site full-time, a report made in 1935 noting that 17 people resided there.

Sourp Magar once housed a collection of manuscripts and other sacred items, but these were re-located to Nicosia in the early 20th century, and the Holy See of Cilicia in 1947. After the 1974 Turkish invasion of Cyprus, the monastic complex became inaccessible and the complex fell into ruins. Due to the efforts of Armenian MP Vartkes Mahdessian, the annual pilgrimage was revived on 6 May 2007 and was repeated between 2009 and 2016.

== Complex ==
The Sourp Magar consists of an irregular rectangle of two-storied residential buildings constructed around a generous precinct. The site overall slopes gently from west to east. Two small churches or chapels, standing in the north-east part of the central courtyard, stand side-by-side. The largest chapel, with its vault still in place, was built in 1814. The chapels appear to be the vestiges of the side aisles of a fairly large church, the nave of which has more or less disappeared. This nave is represented by a large arch (rebuilt) and the common vestibule between the two chapels. The antiquity of the apses is indicated by the masonry which is close to the eleventh-century parts of the churches at Lythrangomi and Aphendrika on the Karpass Peninsula. The Aphendrika churches have been dated to the eleventh century and appear to have suffered a similar fate, being ruined by earthquakes in the thirteenth or fourteenth century

Southern chapel at Sourp Magar, view of the apse from the east, ashlar portions probably eleventh century.

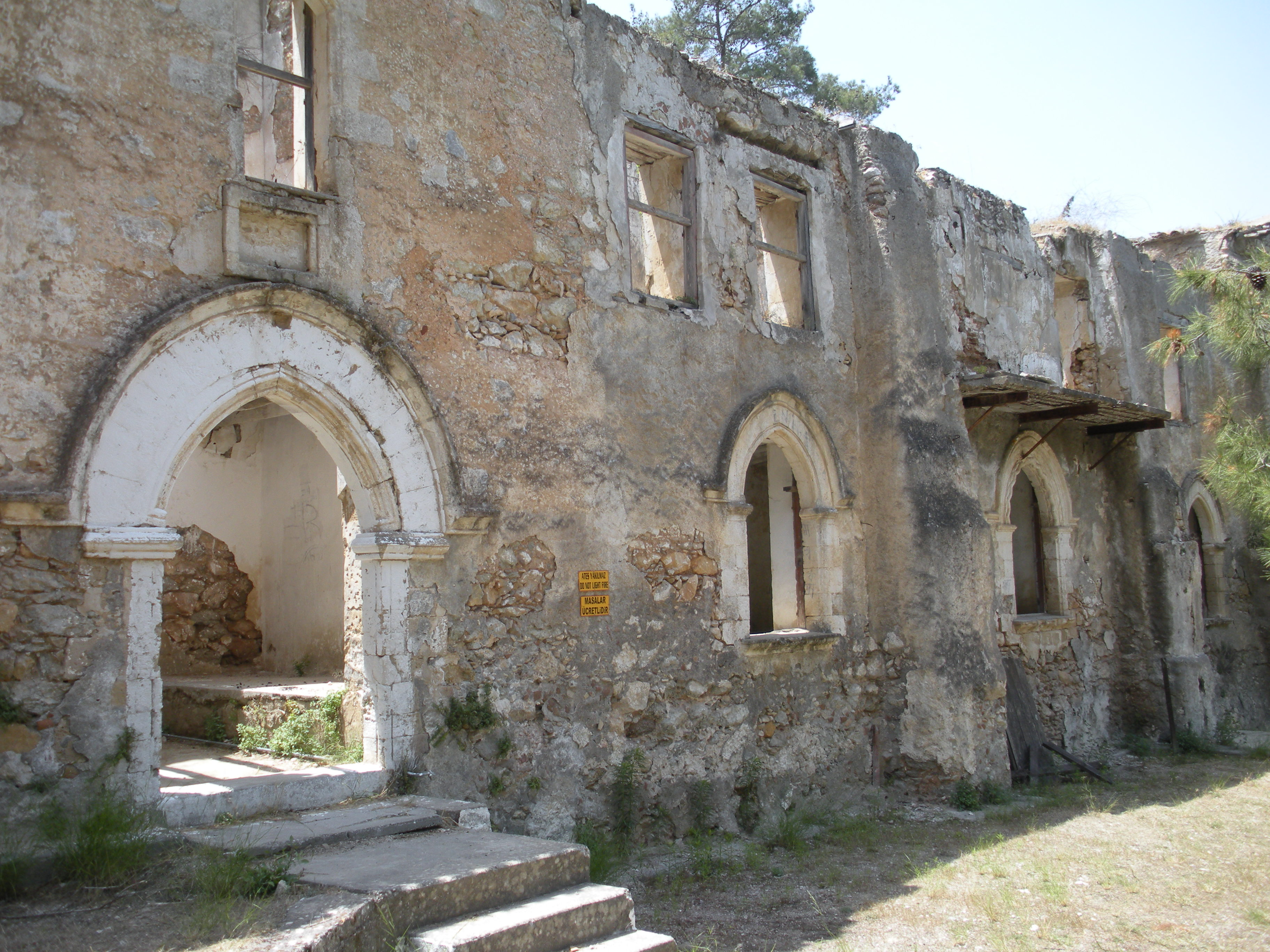
East façade of Sourp Magar, showing main entrance, probably fifteenth century.

The line of residential buildings facing towards the north and east probably belong to the fifteenth century judging from the shape and style of the Gothic windows and doors. One window has a chevron design, a characteristic feature of later Gothic building in Cyprus. These building were probably put up when the Armenians first took possession of the site. Internally, the buildings are two-storied, with a simple arcade below and a walkway above. The walkway was originally edged by stone posts with wooden lintels. The roofs throughout rested on wooden beams and were covered with curved tiles.

The residential buildings at Sourp Magar are the best-preserved and most extensive examples of late medieval domestic building on Cyprus, even in their ruined state. The only architectural account was given by George H. E. Jeffery who, writing in 1918, commented that the east side "retains its architectural character in richly moulded pointed arch windows ... and in a venerable doorway. A large room used as a guest chamber, with the roof supported on a central column at the north-east corner, is of the same date as the eastern façade."

From the 1920s modern tiles and other additions were added in many places, while the post-war period brought rebuilding with reinforced concrete. One of the medieval windows had a concrete awning with steel I-beams inserted into it, evidently to provide a place for a toilet and bathroom. Part of the walkway floor in the interior was also rebuilt using reinforced concrete.

In the aftermath of the 1974 Turkish invasion of Cyprus, there was an initiative to restore and revitalize the site. While the operation did lead to some challenges, including vandalism and looting for building materials, from 2005, the Turkish authorities embarked on a project to rebuild and re-roof several rooms on the south side of the precinct. This effort was undertaken with the intention of providing a welcoming space for forest trekkers to enjoy refreshments. Although there were discussions about further developments, the project has not been continued.

== See also ==
- Armenian Cypriots
- Armenian Prelature of Cyprus
