= Sourp Haroutiun Chapel, Nicosia =

Coordinates: 35.1725°N 33.321181°E

Sourp Haroutiun (Armenian: Սուրբ Յարութիւն; Holy Resurrection) is an Armenian Apostolic chapel in Ayios Dhometios, Nicosia, Cyprus.

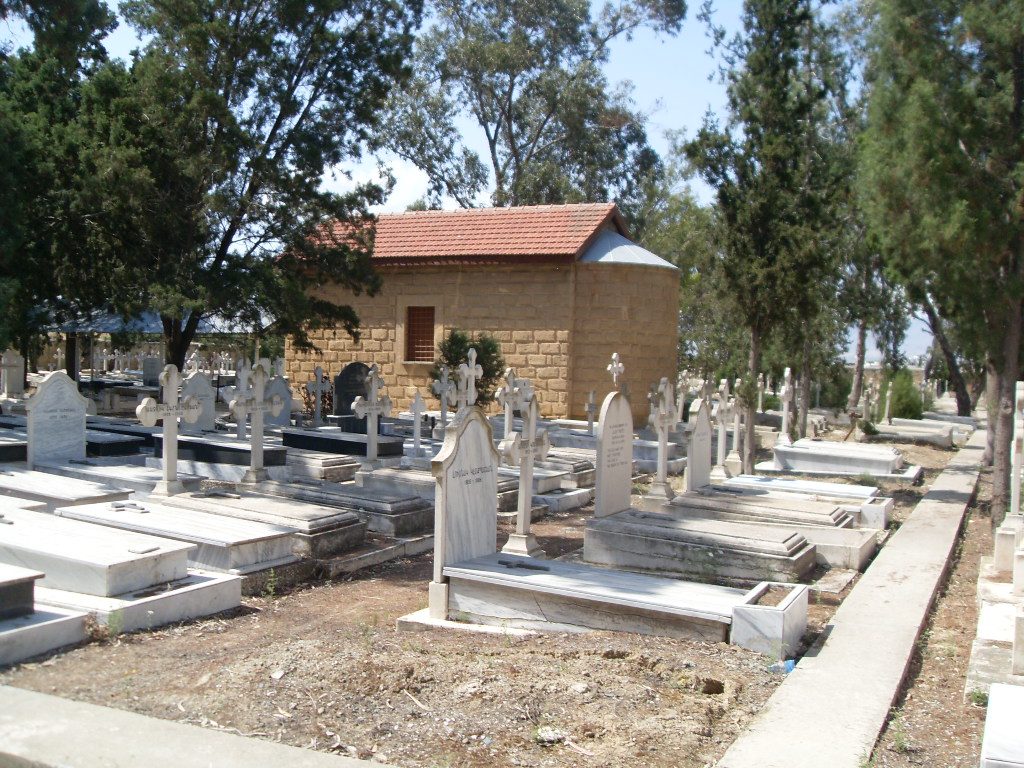
Sourp Haroutiun chapel in Ayios Dhometios

The chapel is located in Nicosia's second Armenian cemetery to the west of Ayios Dhometios and it was built in 1938 by rich businessman Haroutiun Bohdjalian, who was later buried in this cemetery.

The cemetery has been in use as a burial place since February 1931. In 1963, the remains of about 100 persons exhumed from the ancient Armenian cemetery near the Ledra Palace were re-located here and buried in a mass grave. In 1974, following the Turkish invasion, the cemetery and its chapel fell within the UN buffer zone and very near the cease-fire line. As a result, no Liturgies have been held there since 1974 and, until 2007, visits were allowed on one Sunday per month (it was later increased to two Sundays per month). Thanks to the efforts of Armenian MP Vartkes Mahdessian, since 2007 visits are allowed every Sunday noon.

The cemetery was cleared and restored by the UNDP in 2005, and the canopy before the chapel's entrance was re-built. In early 2010, the chapel was restored, with the hope of holding Liturgies there in the near future.

== See also ==
- Armenians in Cyprus
- Armenian Prelature of Cyprus
