= Holy Saviour of All chapel, Nicosia =

Chapel in Cyprus

Coordinates: 35°08′57″N 33°21′54″E

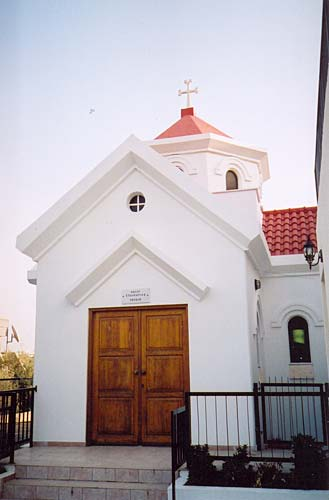
Sourp Amenapergitch chapel in Strovolos

The Holy Saviour Chapel (Armenian: Սուրբ Ամենափրկիչ; Holy Saviour of All) is an Armenian Apostolic chapel on the grounds of the Kalaydjian Rest Home for the Elderly in Strovolos, Nicosia, Cyprus. The chapel was commissioned by the brothers Aram and Bedros Kalaydjian; its foundation stone was laid on 15 December 1995 by Catholicos Aram I Keshishian, who inaugurated and consecrated it on 16 February 1997.

== See also ==
- Armenians in Cyprus
- Armenian Prelature of Cyprus
