= Vartkes Mahdessian =

Vartkes Mahdessian (Armenian: Վարդգէս Մահտեսեան, Greek: Βαρτκές Μαχτεσιάν) is a businessman in Nicosia, Cyprus, managing two companies in Cyprus and the United Arab Emirates and the Representative of the Armenian community in the Cyprus House of Representatives since 2006.

== Biography ==
Vartkes Mahdessian was born in Nicosia, Cyprus on 13 November 1950. After graduating from the Melikian-Ouzounian School and the English School in 1970, he received his Business Administration diploma from Hatfield Polytechnic and then a master's degree in management in 1974. His professional career began in 1975 with an Italian-Greek cable manufacturer as Area Manager for Iran. In 1978 he moved to the United Arab Emirates, first as Marketing Manager, then as Managing Director and shareholder of International Cable Corporation, a post that he still holds by conducting regular visits to the region. In 1986 he returned permanently to Cyprus and acquired ownership of Troodos Electric Cables Ltd.

In the early 1990s he was the coach of AYMA's football team and also served for some years as the club's Chairman. Between 1998-2004 he was a member of the Board of Management of the English School, while in 1999 he was elected a member of the Diocesan Council of the Armenian Prelature of Cyprus; he held that position until 2006 and, since he was elected as Representative, he is an ex officio member of the Council.

On 21 May 2006, he was elected Representative of the Armenian community, after receiving 52,60% of the votes (899) against Dr. Vahakn Atamyan. He was re-elected on 22 May 2011, after securing 67,67% of the votes (1.105) against Dr. Antranik Ashdjian. On 3 September 2011, Vartkes Mahdessian was decorated with the Mekhitar Kosh medal by the President of Armenia, Serzh Sargsyan.

Vartkes Mahdessian is married to Maggie Sahakian from Lebanon and has one son, Vicken, and one daughter, Carla.
