= Armenia–Cyprus relations =

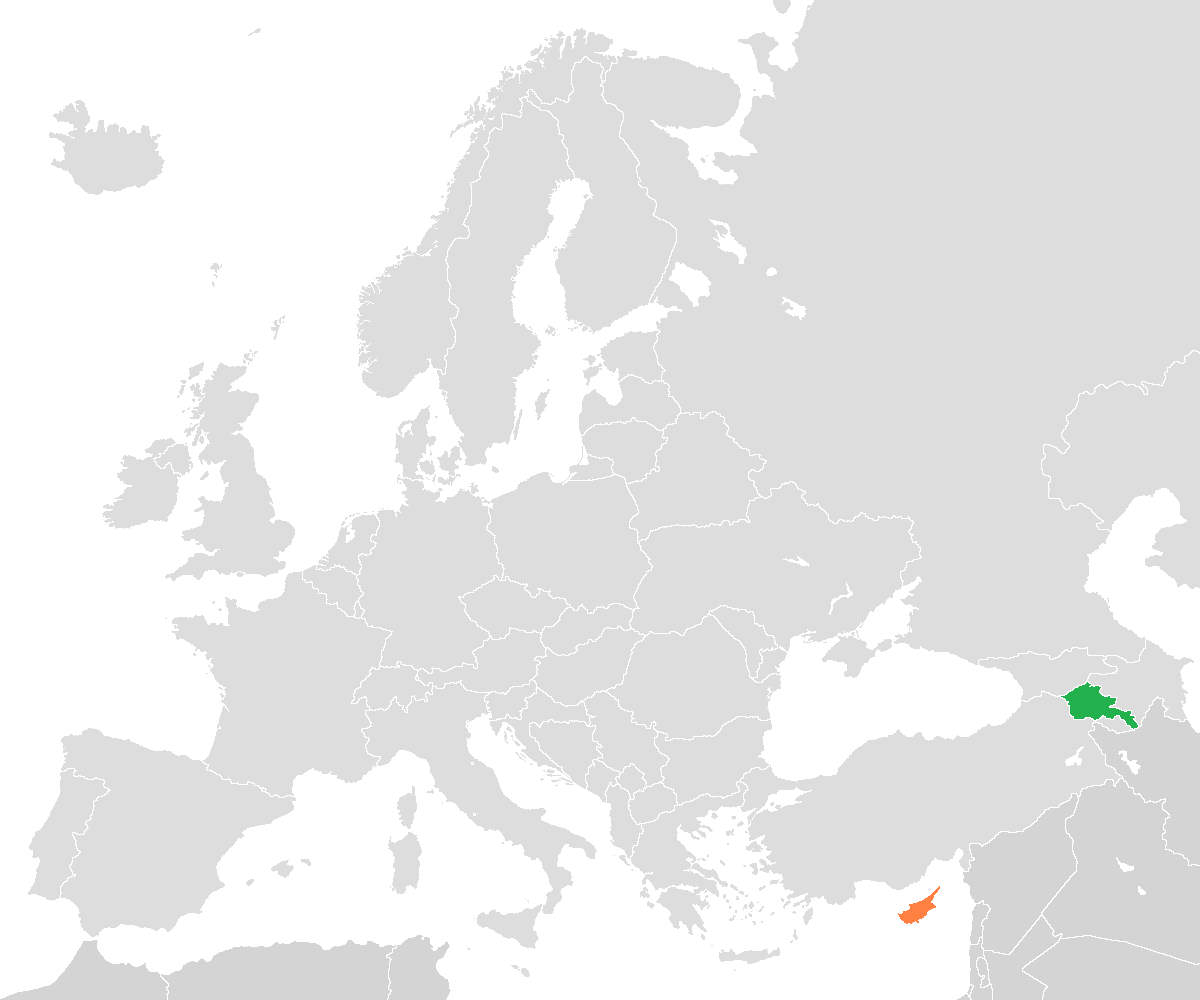

- Armenia: Cyprus

Armenia-Cyprus relations have been historically strong. Cyprus has supported Armenia in its struggle for the recognition of the Armenian genocide, economic stability and resolution of the Nagorno-Karabakh conflict. Armenia supported Cyprus after the Turkish invasion in 1974 and backed a lasting solution to the Cyprus dispute.

Relations between Armenia and Cyprus include cooperation in trade, military, intelligence services, foreign policy and arts. Armenia is accredited to Cyprus from its embassy in Athens, Greece and Cyprus has an embassy in Yerevan.

== Modern relations ==
=== Post Armenian independence ===
==== Nagorno-Karabakh conflict ====
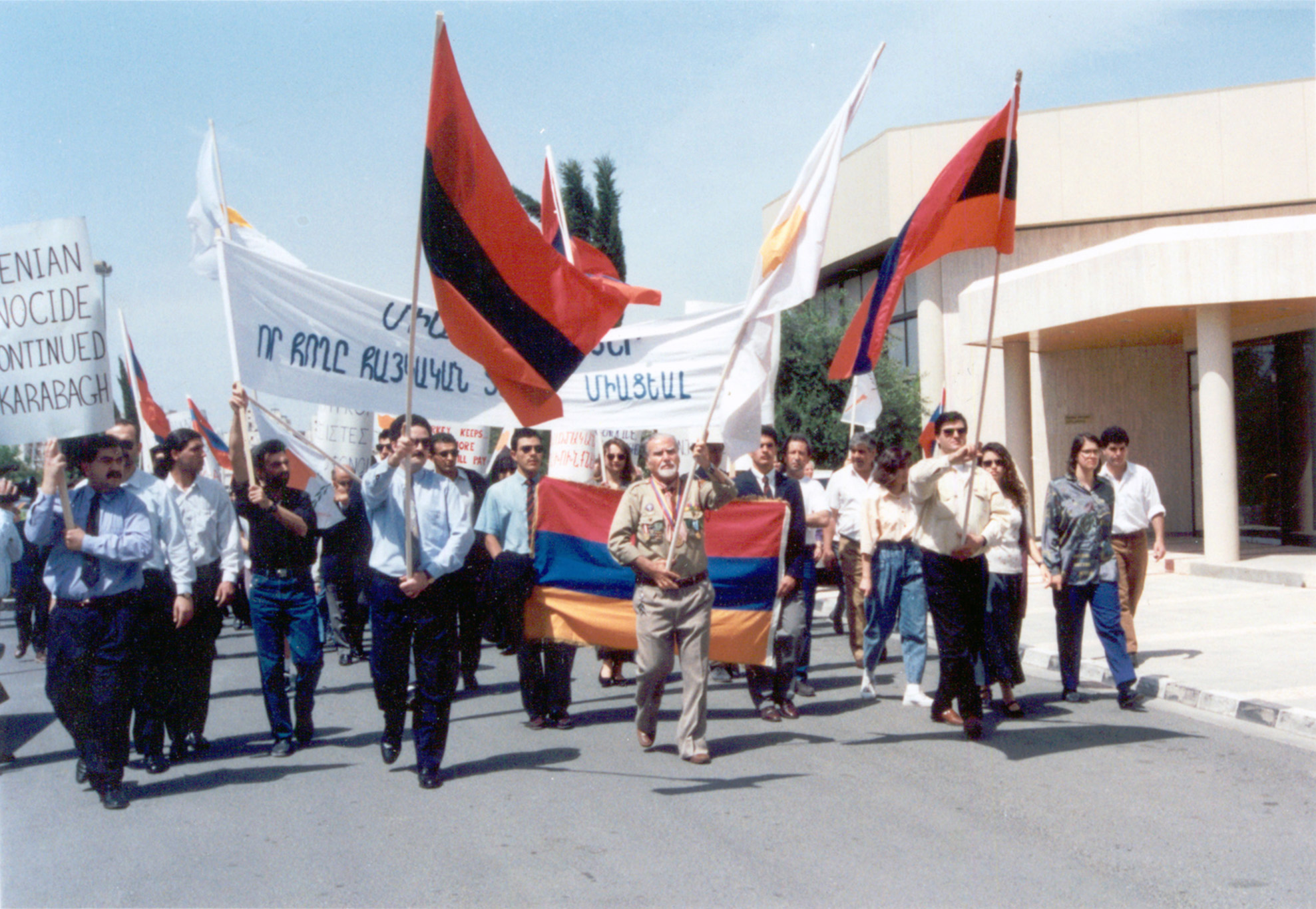
Demonstration on the Nagorno-Karabakh in Cyprus in 1993

Inter ethnic fighting between Armenia and neighbouring Azerbaijan broke out shortly after the parliament of Nagorno-Karabakh, an autonomous oblast in Azerbaijan, voted to unify the region with Armenia on February 20, 1988. The Armenian demand to unify Karabakh with Armenia, which proliferated in the late 1980s, began in a relatively peaceful manner; however, as the Soviet Union's disintegration neared, the dispute gradually grew into a violent conflict between the ethnic groups in Nagorno-Karabakh, resulting in ethnic cleansing by all sides. The joint declaration between Cyprus and Armenia in January 2011 mentions that the Republic of Cyprus expresses its support to the constructive efforts of Armenia to resolve Nagorno-Karabakh conflict within the OSCE Minsk Group process through negotiations based on the principles of the United Nations Charter and the Helsinki Final act and the elements proposed by the Presidents of the OSCE Minsk Group Co-Chair countries, which include, inter alia, the determination of the final status of Nagorno-Karabakh through legally binding expression of will. In return Armenian President welcomed Cyprus position as a member of EU for its balanced stance on the Karabakh issue, drawing attention to determination of Nagorno-Karabakh's final status in terms of legally binding free expression of will.

On May 19, 2025, President of the Cypriot House of Representatives Annita Demetriou declared Azerbaijan’s ongoing sham trials against Armenian POWs as unacceptable.

==== Armenian genocide recognition ====
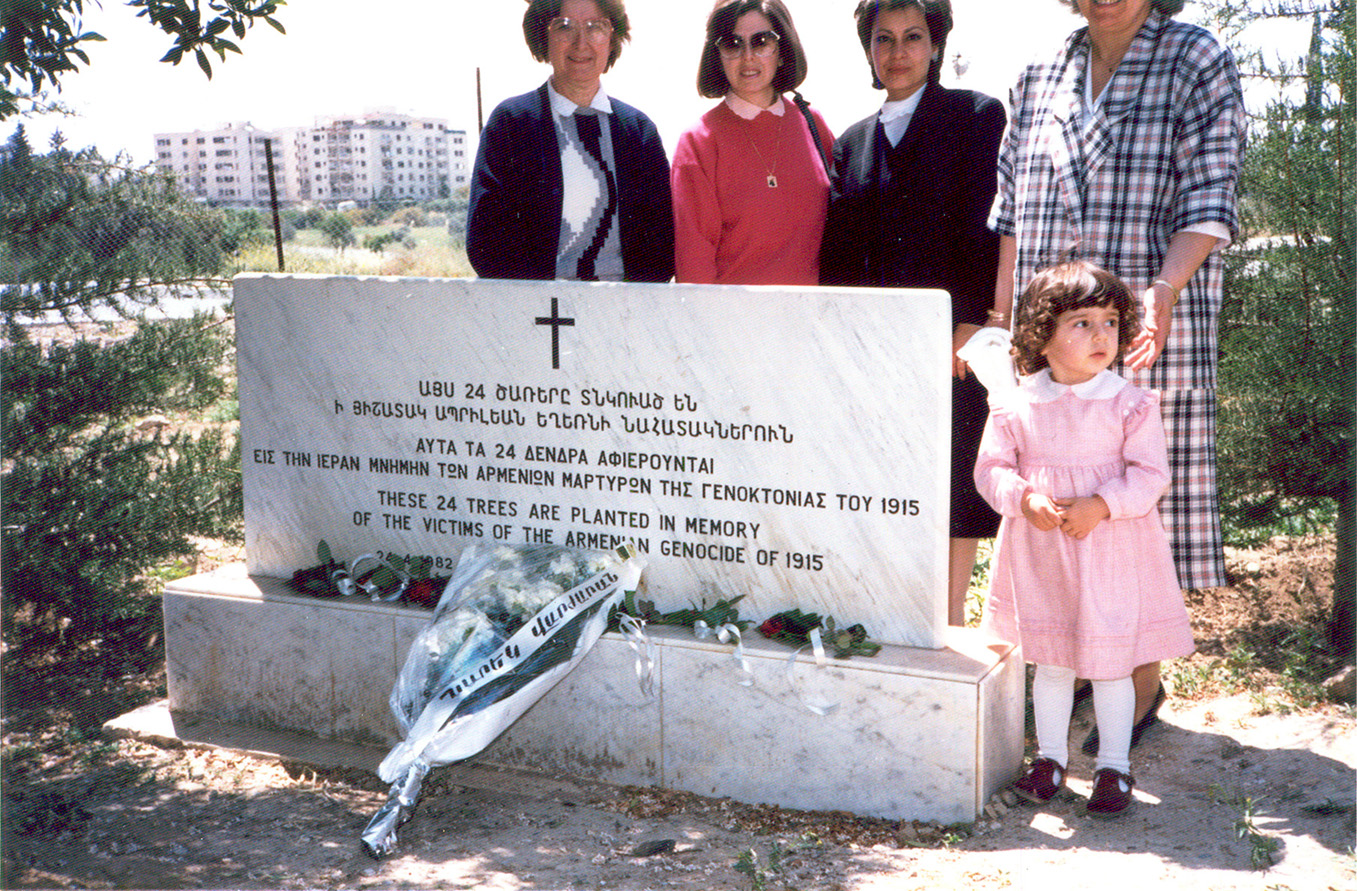
Armenian-Cypriot women in front of the Armenian genocide monument at Acropolis Park in Nicosia in 1988

Cyprus has been one of the pioneering countries in recognising the Armenian genocide, when on 25 January 1965 Foreign Minister Spyros Kyprianou first raised the issue to the General Assembly of the United Nations. Prior to his powerful speech, a delegation comprising ARF Dashnaktsoutiun Bureau members Dr. Papken Papazian and Berj Missirlia, as well as Armenian National Committee of Cyprus members Anania Mahdessian and Vartkes Sinanian, handed him a memorandum urging Cyprus' support in raising the issue at the United Nations.

Cyprus was also the first European country (and the second world-wide, after Uruguay) to officially recognise the Armenian genocide. On 24 April 1975, after the determined efforts of Representative Dr. Antranik L. Ashdjian, Resolution 36 was passed unanimously by the House of Representatives. Representative Aram Kalaydjian was instrumental in passing unanimously through the House of Representatives two more resolutions regarding the Armenian genocide: Resolution 74/29–04–1982, submitted by the Foreign Relations' Parliamentary Committee, and Resolution 103/19–04–1990, submitted by all parliamentary parties. Resolution 103 declared 24 April as a National Remembrance Day of the Armenian Genocide in Cyprus.

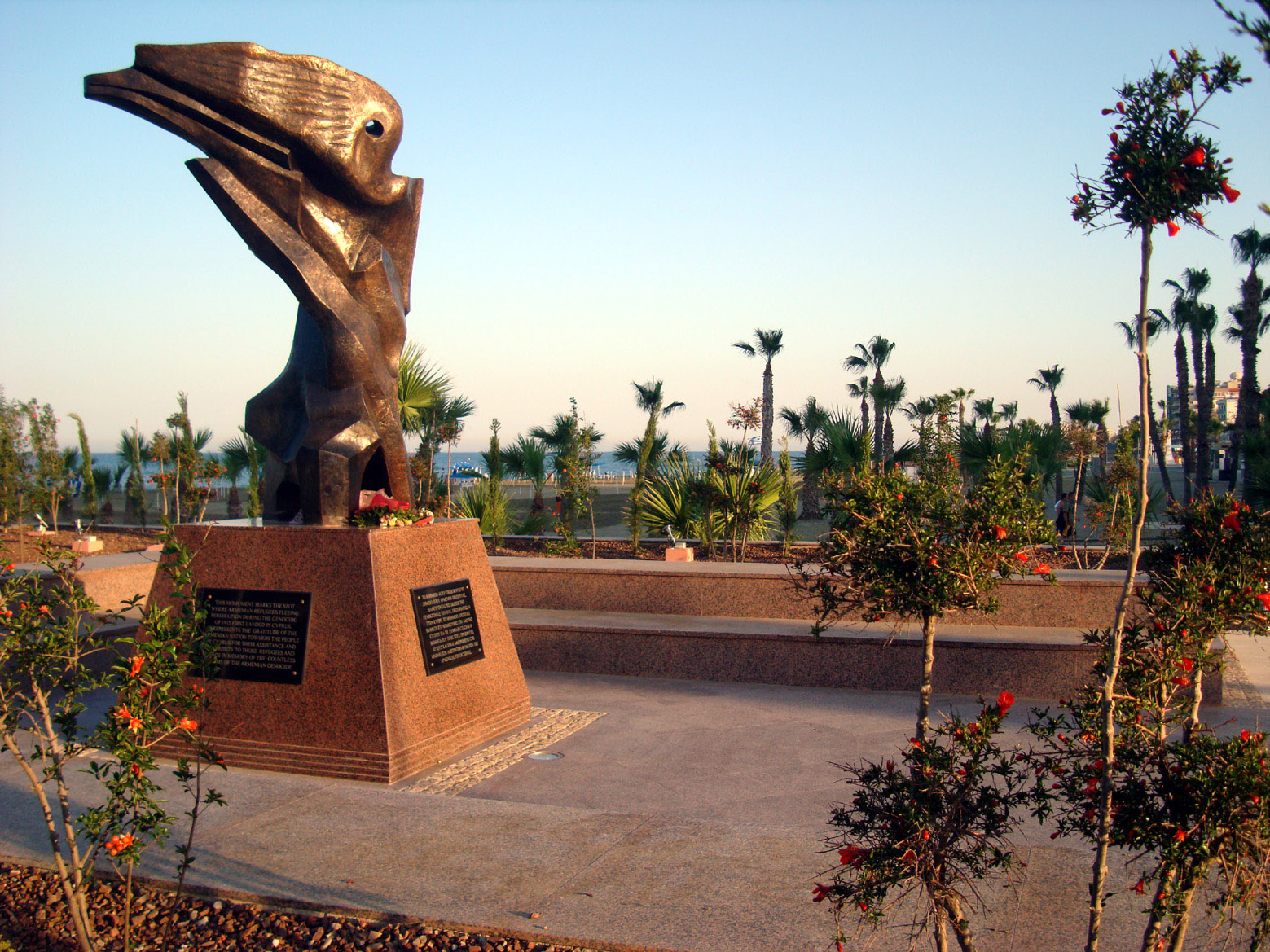
Armenian genocide monument in Larnaca

Since 1965, Cypriot government officials have participated in the annual Armenian genocide commemoration. Cyprus' political leaders are often keynote speakers at these events. A march is held starting from the centre of Nicosia and ending at the Sourp Asdvadzadzin church in Strovolos, where a commemorative event is held in front of the Armenian Genocide Monument.

==== Armenian genocide memorials ====
As the second country in the world to recognize the Armenian genocide, Cyprus has built three genocide memorials in respect to the victims. One of the memorials is located in Nicosia, and the others are located in Larnaca and Paphos.

== Cypriot response to the release of Ramil Safarov ==
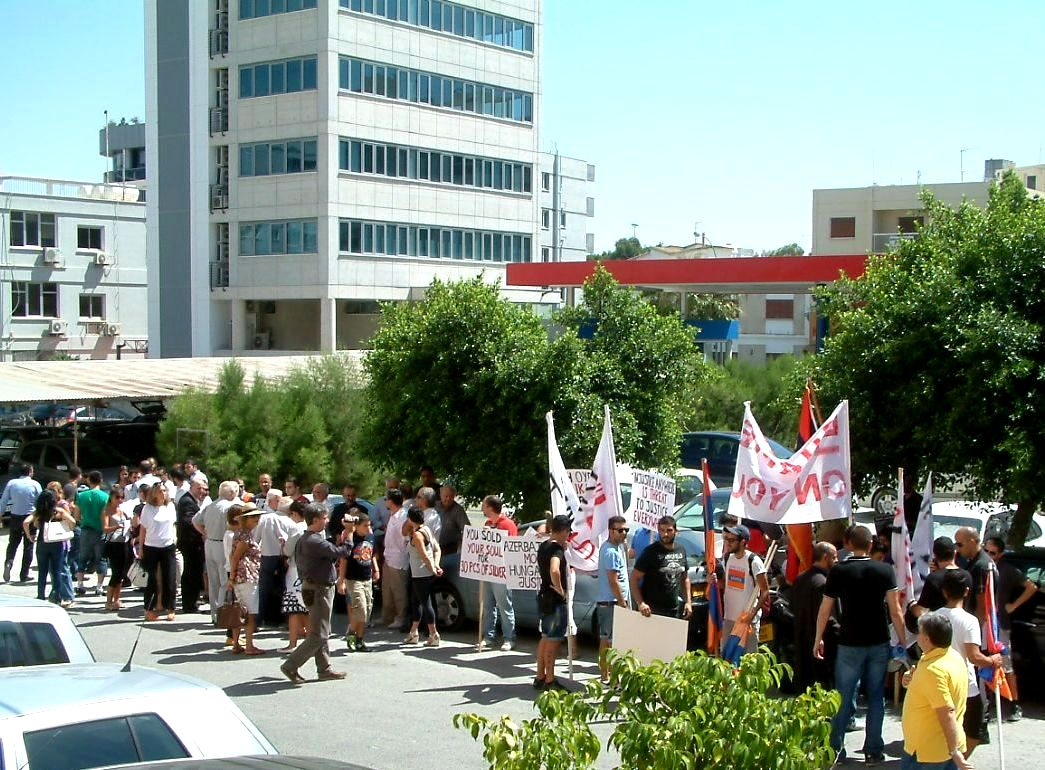
Armenian-Cypriots protest in front of Hungarian Embassy in Nicosia over the extradition of Ramil Safarov to Azerbaijan

Cyprus Minister of Foreign Affairs Erato Kozakou-Marcoullis's statement said "we deeply regret and deplore this Presidential pardon and the damage inflicted by the actions that followed the release, aimed at glorifying this hideous crime, to the reconciliation efforts with Azerbaijan and we are also very concerned of its effects on regional stability." Following the release of Ramil Safarov immediate protests broke out in all cities of Cyprus with the biggest being in Nicosia taking place outside the Hungarian Embassy. Cypriot press expressed negatively on the role of the Hungarian government for the release of Ramil Safarov.

== Areas of Cooperation ==
=== Educational cooperation ===
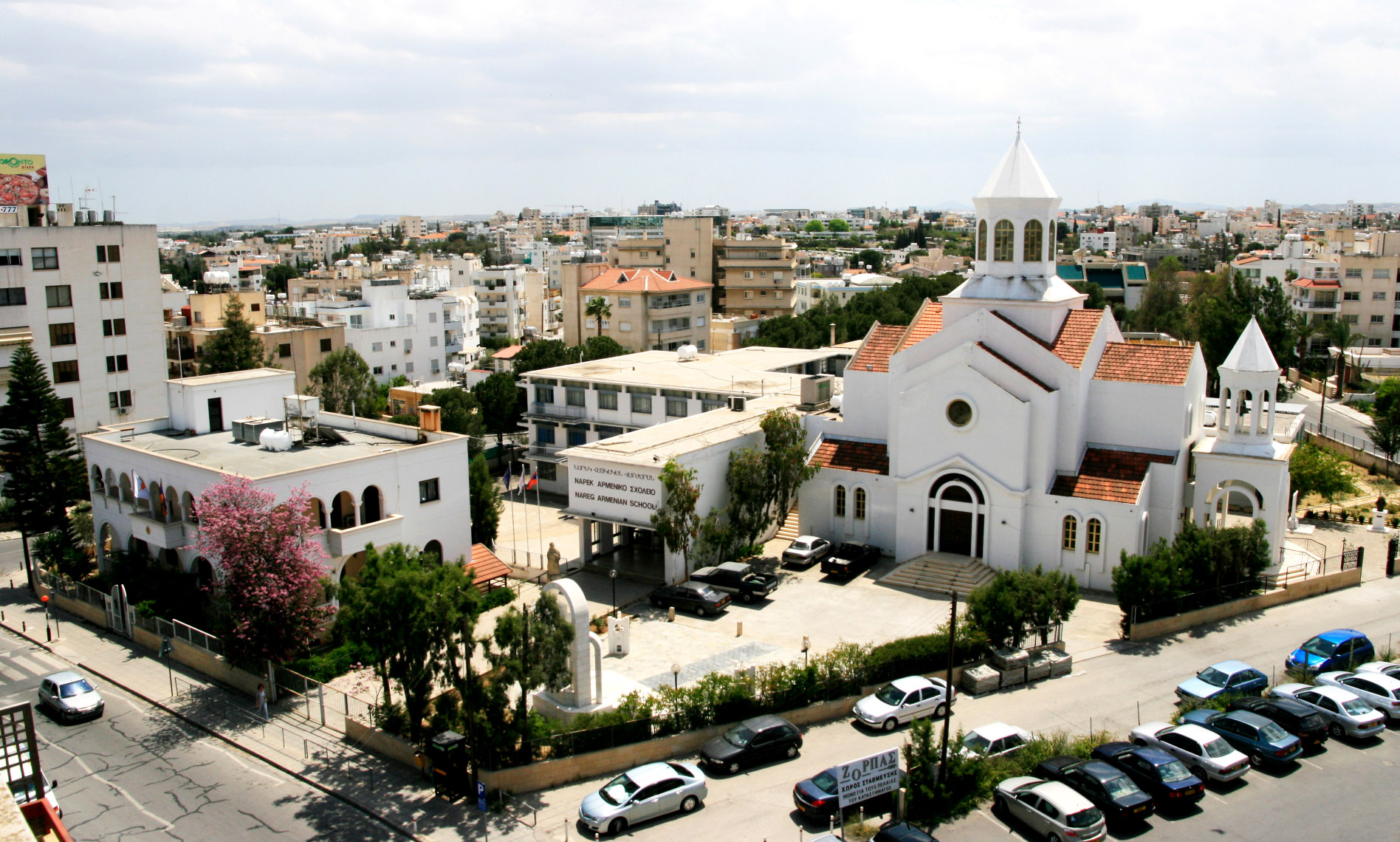
Armenian compound in Nicosia

There are Armenian Elementary Schools in Cyprus in the cities of Larnaca, Limassol and Nicosia and a Gymnasium in Nicosia. The Melkonian Educational Institute was the most renowned co-educational institution of Armenian-Cypriots. Founded in 1926, the Melkonian Institute was open to Armenian students from all over the world and offered a comprehensive secondary school curriculum. All subjects, except for the Armenian language, were taught in English and foreign languages offered included Greek, French, Arabic, Persian, Russian and Bulgarian. A daily hourly radio programme by the Cyprus Broadcasting Corporation in Armenian includes extensive interviews, news coverage, cultural reports and music. Two Armenian monthly newspapers have been founded on the island, Artsankank (1995) and Azad Tsayn (founded 2003), which provide national and international news, primarily in Armenian and with certain columns printed in Greek and in English.

=== Economic cooperation ===
Every year, Cyprus-Armenian Business Forums are held either in Nicosia or in Yerevan, with an aim to further boost trade and investment between the two countries. Armenian companies will be able to expand more effectively into the European Union and Middle East markets in co-operation with Cypriot companies. This co-operation can and should be reciprocal, with Armenia serving as an access route to the Caucasian countries for the business world of Cyprus.

=== Cultural cooperation ===
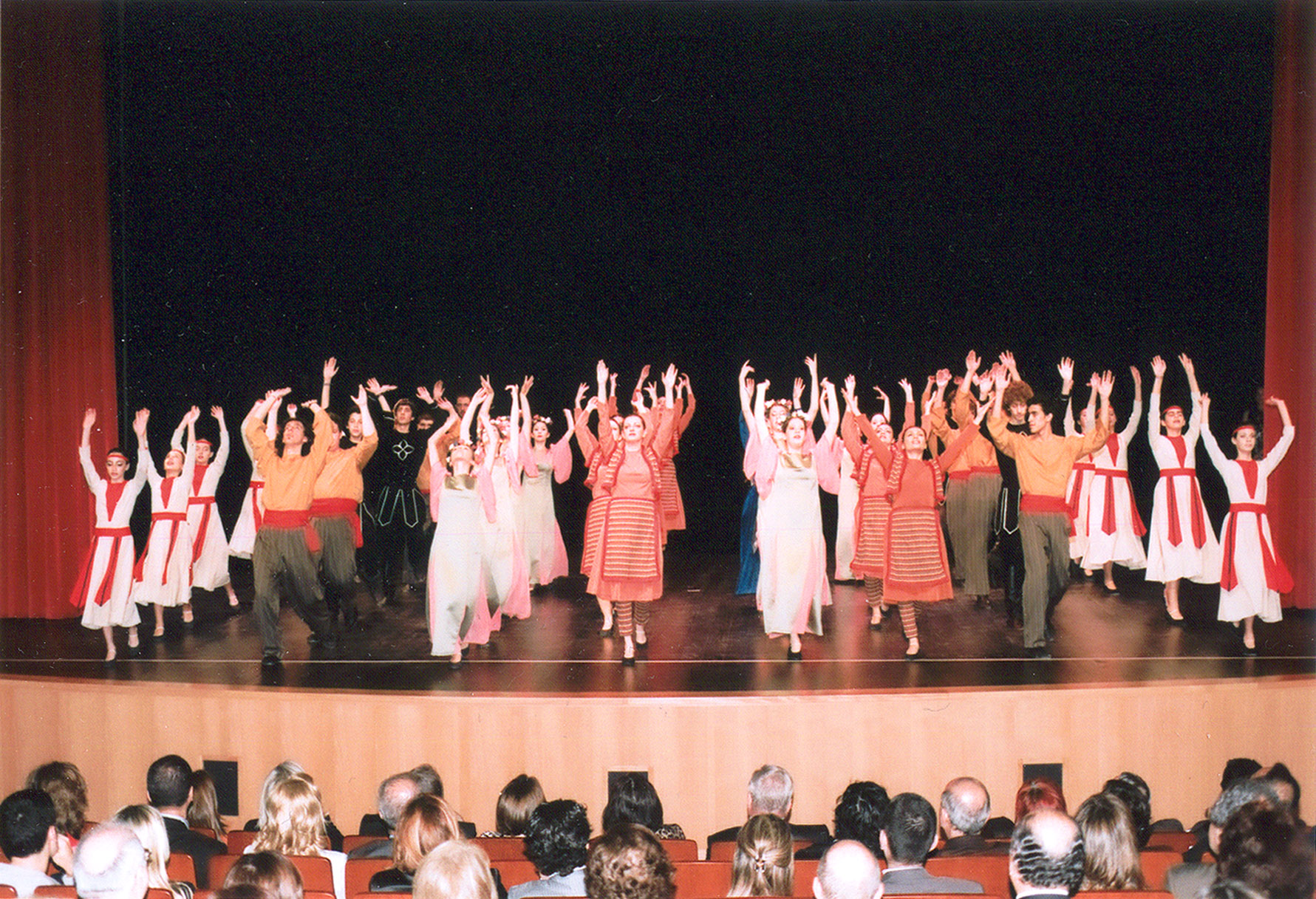
Sipan dance ensemble performing

The Armenian community of Cyprus receives a generous funding from the Cypriot government, which enables the organisation of concerts, dance performances, art and photographic exhibitions, as well as literary events. The Armenian Prelature of Cyprus has allocated space within its premises (Utidjian Hall) to encourage cultural events, such as the annual Autumn Book Exhibition. The Middle/Near East Armenian Research Centre (established in 1996 by Vartan Malian) houses a reference library and archival material in its Nicosia premises.

=== Military cooperation ===
On August 31, 2021 Armenia, Greece, and Cyprus signed the Tripartite Defence Cooperation Program. The Program sees all three militaries conduct joint training exercises, sharing of expertise and promoting military cooperation between the three countries.

On December 19, 2024, Armenia, Greece, and Cyprus signed a new defense cooperation for 2025. Possibilities of transferring Greek missile systems and other equipment to Yerevan after 2026 was also discussed.

== Accession of Armenia to the EU ==
Cyprus is openly advocating the Accession of Armenia to the EU in the shortest period of time. Referring to the Armenia-EU relations, President Demetris Christofias pledged that Nicosia will continue supporting actively the further enhancement of this relationship, indicating a full membership candidate status for Armenia in the nearest future. Cyprus, he said, is the firmest supporter and friend of Armenia in the EU.

== Resident diplomatic missions ==
- Armenia is accredited to Cyprus from its embassy in Athens, Greece and an honorary consulate in Nicosia.
- Cyprus has an embassy in Yerevan.

== See also ==
- Foreign relations of Armenia
- Foreign relations of Cyprus
- Armenia-EU relations
  - Accession of Armenia to the EU
- Armenian education in Cyprus
- Armenian genocide recognition
- Armenian monuments in Cyprus
- Armenian religion in Cyprus
- Armenians in Cyprus
