= Armenian monuments in Cyprus =

Despite its small size, the Armenian-Cypriot community has plenty of monuments to show:

== Nicosia ==
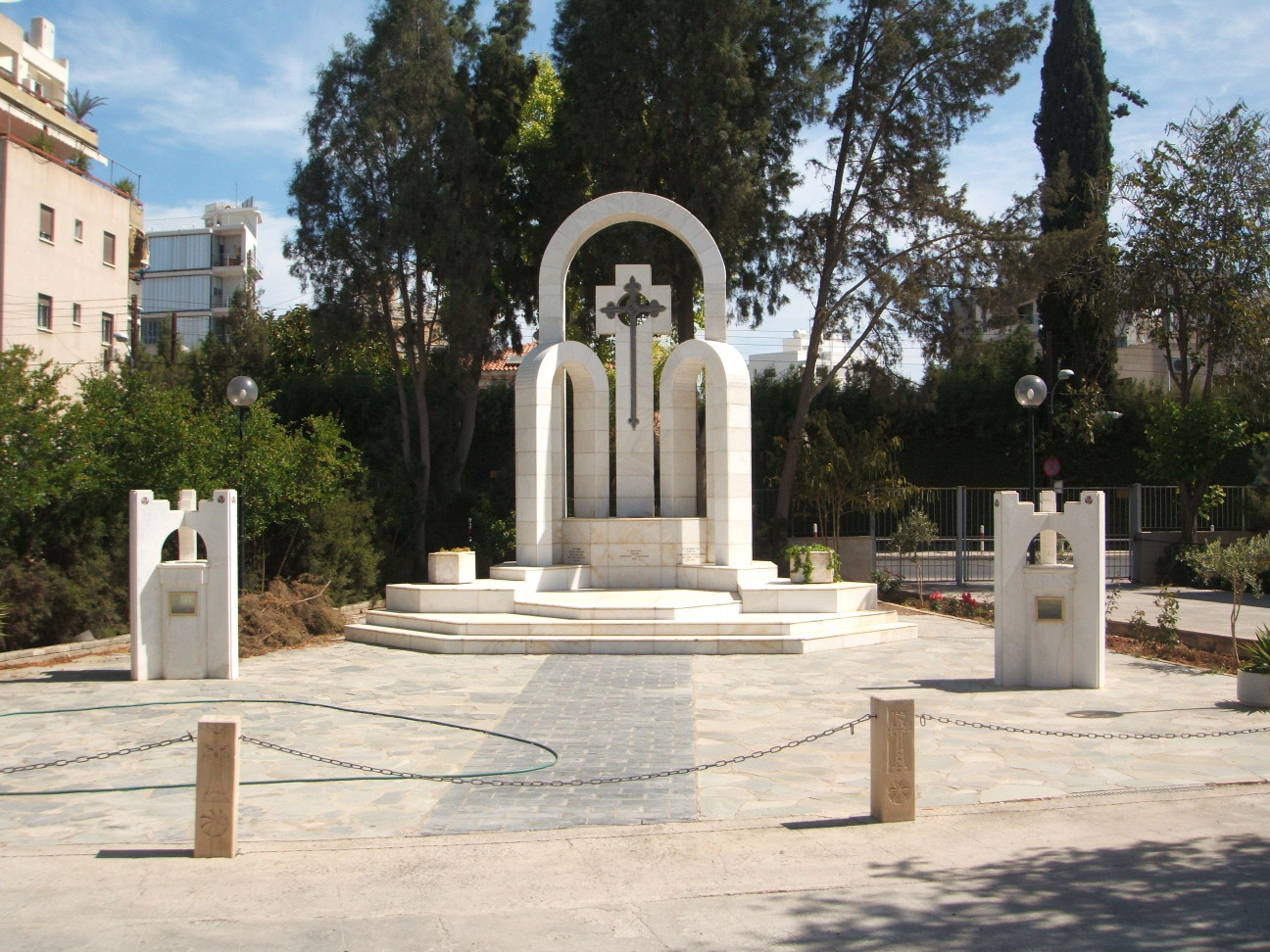
Genocide monument in Strovolos, Nicosia

The present white marble Armenian Genocide Monument was constructed between 1990 and 1991 by architect and painter John Guevherian and is located in the courtyard of the new Sourp Asdvadzadzin church in Strovolos, Nicosia. It was officially presented on 24 April 1991. It features three arches – representing Armenia and the two Diasporas, the one within the USSR and the one outside it – and a black granite cross, the work of Armenian sculptor Levon Tokmadjian. The idea for its creation goes back to the 70th commemoration of the Armenian genocide in 1985, when Catholicosal Vicar, Senior Archimandrite Yeghishe Mandjikian, laid the idea for this monument. The monument bears three inscriptions:

Στη μνήμη 1.500.000 Αρμενίων σφαγιασθέντων από τους Τούρκους το 1915 (in Greek), Ի յիշատակ 1,500,000 ապրիլեան նահատակաց 1915 (in Armenian) and In memory of 1.500.000 Armenians massacred by the Turks in 1915 (in English)

On the lower right-hand side of the monument, there is the following inscription:

Architect John Guevherian (in English) Ճարտարապետ Ճոն Կէվհէրեան (sic) (in Armenian) -1990-

In 1996 some martyrs' remains, brought by members of an Armenian Relief Society mission from the Der Zor desert in Syria, were interred within the monument. A marble commemorative plaque in Armenian was placed on the monument reading:

Այս հանգչին ոսկրք Մարգատէի (Տէր-Զօր) նահատակաց 1996 [Here lay bones of martyrs from Markade (Der-Zor) 1996]

More bone remains are kept in the two marble ossuaries, built in 2000 in front of the monument by the Eghoyian and Tembekidjian families. Facing the monument, the ossuaries bear the following inscriptions in Armenian:

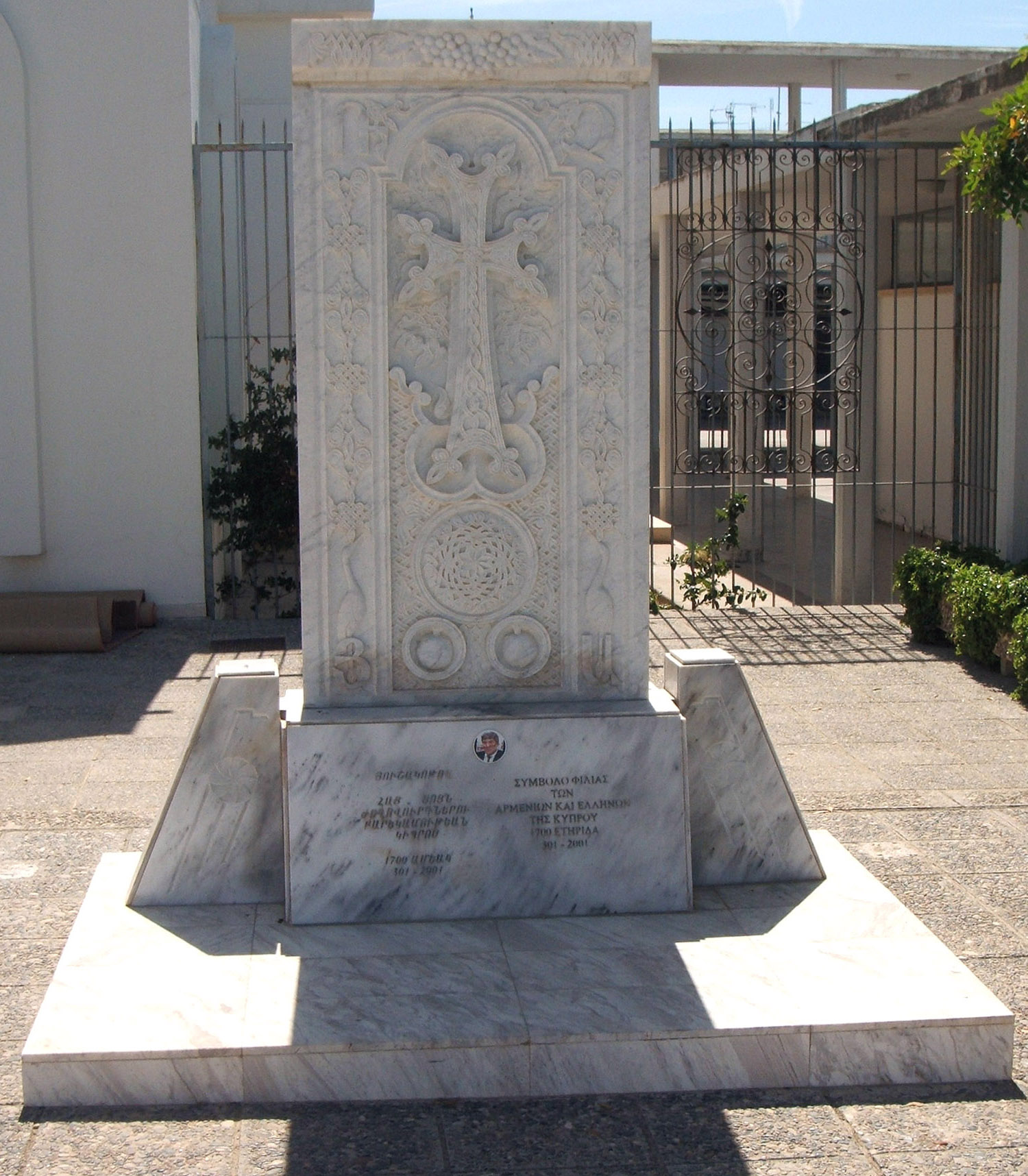
The khachkar in Nicosia

Ի յիշատակ Կ. Էկոյեան ընտանիքի 2000 In memory of G. Eghoyan family (left ossuary)

Ի յիշատակ Թէմպէքիճեան ընտանիքի 2000 In memory of Tembekidjian family (right ossuary)

Around the monument and the two ossuaries are five khachkar-like columns, built with the donation of Anahid Der Movsessian in 2000. The sandstone columns are linked together by chains. The central one bears the following inscription in Armenian:

Արդեամբ Անահիտ Տէր Մովսէսեանի 2000 (By commission of Anahid Der Movsessian 2000)

In front of the Sourp Asdvadzadzin church, there is a white marble khachkar, the work of Lebanese-Armenian sculptor Boghos Taslakian (also known as Aghassi), which stands as a symbol of friendship between Armenians and Greeks of Cyprus. The khachkar was unveiled on 21 October 2001 by Presidential Commissioner Manolis Christophides and it bears the following inscription:

Յուշակոթող Հայ-Յոյն ժողովուրդներու բարեկամութեան Կիպրոս 1700ամեակ 301–2001 (in Armenian) and Σύμβολο φιλίας των Αρμενίων και Ελλήνων της Κύπρου 1700ετηρίδα 301–2001 (in Greek) (A symbol of friendship of Armenians and Greeks of Cyprus 1700th anniversary 301–2001)

Behind this khachkar, there is the following inscription, the sculptor's alias:

Aghassi

Also in front of the Sourp Asdvadzadzin church, there is a bronze bust of Archbishop Zareh Aznavorian (1947–2004), the work of Armenian sculptor Mgrdich Mazmanian. The bust was unveiled on 1 May 2005 by its benefactor, Italian-Armenian Alecco Bezikian. It bears the following inscription in Armenian:

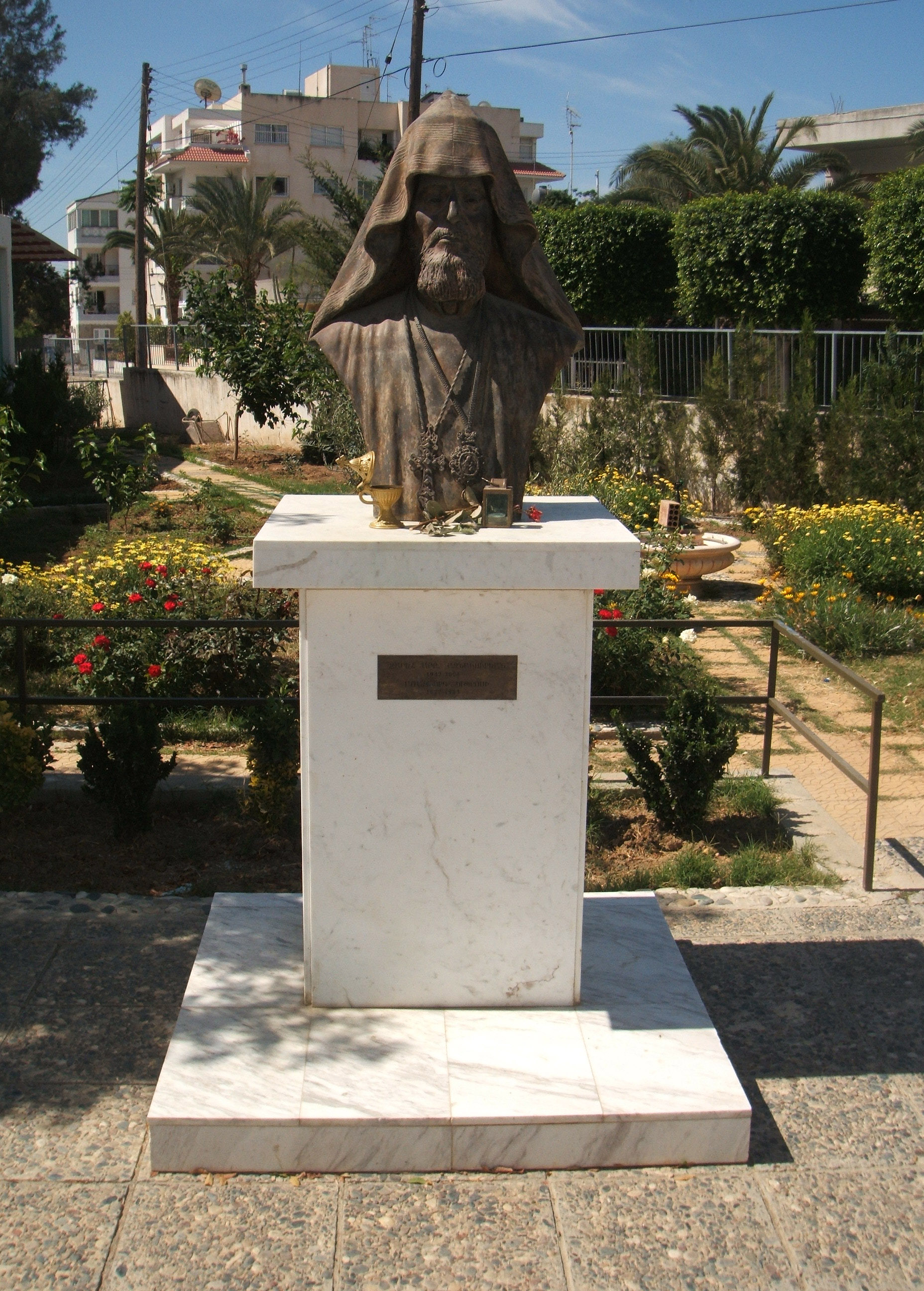
The bust of Archbishop Zareh Aznavorian

Զարեհ Արք. Ազնաւորեան 1947–2004 - Առաջնորդ Կիպրոսի 1977–1983 (Archbishop Zareh Aznavorian 1947–2004 - Prelate of Cyprus 1977–1983)

On the lower right-hand side of the bust, it bears the following inscription in Armenian, the sculptor's name:

Մ. Մազմանյան 2004 [M(grdich) Mazmanian 2004]

Behind the bust, there is a small garden with a fountain in the centre of it, erected in 2005. It bears the following inscription in Armenian:

Նուիրատուութեամբ՝ Տէր եւ Տիկ. Լեւոն (sic) եւ Գոհարիկ Գոնեալեանի (sic) (By donation of Mr and Mrs Levon and Koharig Konyalian)

In front of the Nareg School there is the sandstone statue of monk, poet, mystical philosopher and theologian Saint Krikor Naregatsi (951–1003), the work of Armenian sculptor Levon Tokmadjian. It was unveiled on 24 March 1991 by Representative Aram Kalaydjian. Under the statue the following inscription is inscribed in Armenian:

Գրիգոր Նարեկացի (Gregory of Nareg)

Behind the statue, the following inscription is inscribed in Armenian, the sculptor's name:

Լեվոն Թոք 1991 [Levon Tok(madjian) 1991]

Also in 1991, the sandstone bust of AGBU's founder and first Chairman Boghos Noubar Pasha (1851–1930) was placed to the side of Nicosia AGBU's entrance, also the work of Armenian sculptor Levon Tokmadjian. Under the bust the following inscription is inscribed in Armenian:

Պօղոս Նուպար Փաշա (Boghos Noubar Pasha)

It is worth mentioning the fact that the road in front of the Armenian compound in Strovolos, Nicosia was renamed on 10 December 1979 from Cyclops street to Armenia street, after a decision by Strovolos Improvement Board, as a gesture of solidarity to the brotherly Armenian people. The decision was taken after Bishop Zareh Aznavorian and community members made this suggestion. Today, Armenia street is one of the busiest roads of the greater Nicosia area and it is the centre of the traditional march for the commemoration of the Armenian genocide on 24 April every year. Also worth mentioning is the fact that the road to the side of the Melkonian Educational Institute was renamed on 23 March 2001 from Ephesus street to Melkonian street, after a decision by Aglandjia Municipality. The decision was taken after a request by the Melkonian Educational Institute, on the occasion of the 75th anniversary of the school's operation.

On 28 April 2002, a white marble tomb-ossuary containing some martyrs' remains, brought by an Armenian Youth Federation mission from the Der Zor desert in Syria in 2001, was unveiled by Bishop Varoujan Hergelian in front of the AYMA premises in Strovolos, Nicosia. The monument bears an inscription in Armenian:

Թող աճիւններն այս անթաղ մեր պապերուն նահատակ դառնան մեզ խիղճ, սթափեցնող ռումբ, ուժանակ, մեզ օրօրող օտարութեան ախտերէն... (Let these ashes of our unburied forefathers turn our consciousness into a martyr, an awaking bomb, a dynamite, which lulls us from the maladies of the foreign lands...)

Next to the monument, there is an inscription in Greek reading:

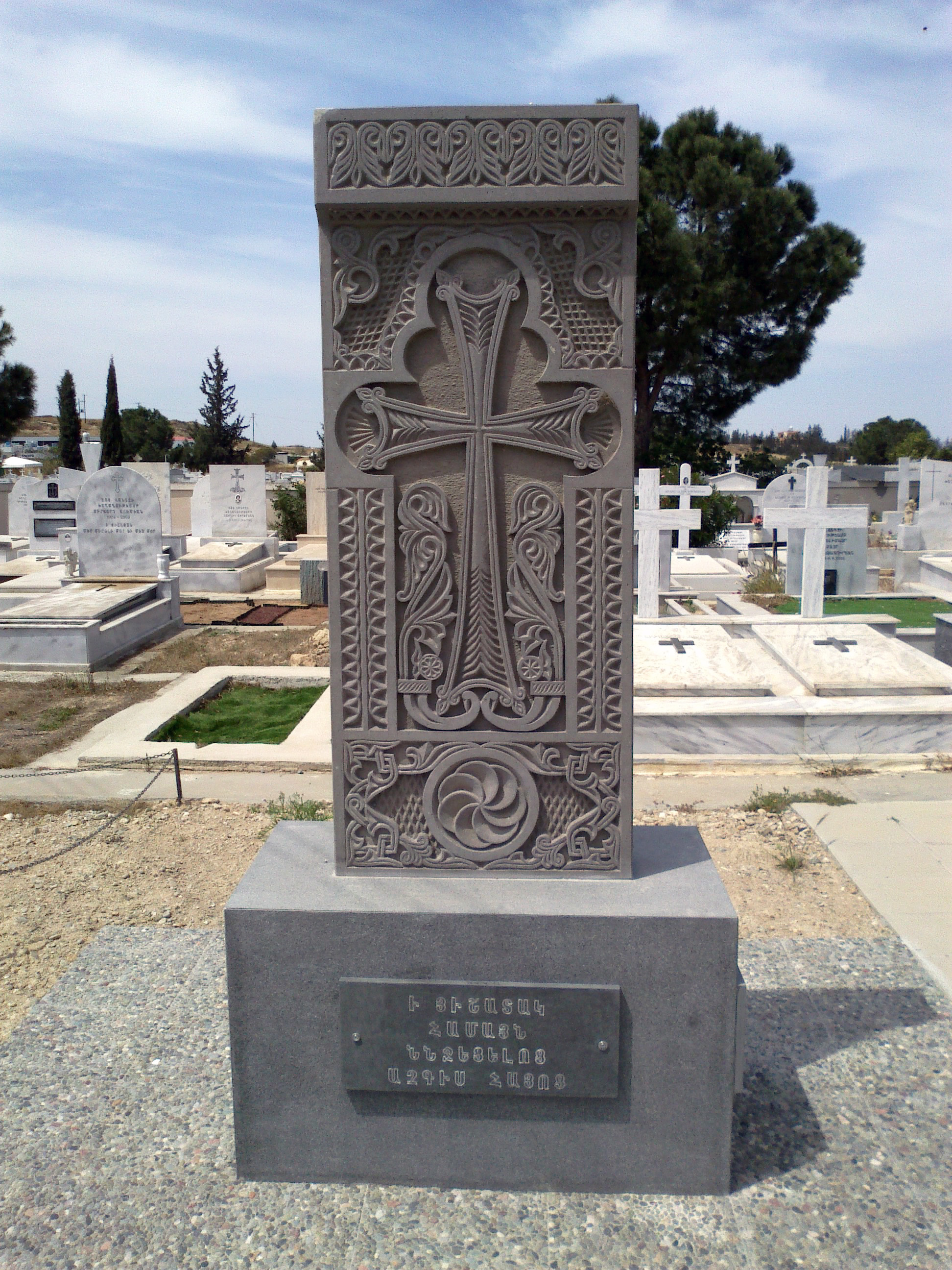
The khachkar at the new Armenian cemetery in Nicosia

Τα οστά των Αρμενίων μαρτύρων της Γενοκτονίας του 1915 που κείτονται σε αυτό το χώρο ας υπενθυμίζουν στην ανθρωπότητα για το έγκλημα που έμεινε χωρίς καταδίκη, ας υπενθυμίζουν στους ισχυρούς της Γης για τα εκατομμύρια που χάθηκαν και διψούν για δικαιοσύνη, ας υπενθυμίζουν στις νεότερες γενεές πως βαρύ είναι το χρέος που κληρονομούν και ας είναι το μνημείο αυτό ένα μνημόσυνο, ένα καντήλι άσβεστο, που να κρατά αιώνια τη μνήμη των 1.500.000 αθώων θυμάτων της Αρμενικής Γενοκτονίας (The bones of the Armenian martyrs of the 1915 Genocide which lay in this place may they remind humanity about the crime that was left without conviction, may they remind to the powerful of the Earth about the millions who were lost and are thirsty for justice, may they remind the younger generations that the debt they inherit is heavy and may this monument be a requiem, an inextinguishable candle, which will keep eternal the memory of the 1.500.000 innocent victims of the Armenian Genocide)

To the right of the entrance of the new Armenian cemetery of Nicosia, there is a grey tuff stone khachkar. It was carved in Sisian province, Armenia by Armenian sculptor Grisha Avedissian and was donated by Dickran Ouzounian. It was placed there in early 2013. On the lower front side of the khachkar base, there is the following granite inscription in Armenian:

Ի յիշատակ համայն ննջեցելոց ազգիս Հայոց (In memory of all deceased of the Armenian nation)

On the lower right-hand side of the khachkar base, there is the following granite inscription in Armenian:

Նուէր Ստեփան Ուզունեան ընտանիքի կողմէ 2012 (Gift by the family of Stepan Ouzounian 2012)

On the upper right-hand side of the khachkar there is the following inscription in Armenian, the sculptor's initials:

Գ. Ա. [G(risha) A(vedissian)]

There is also a commemorative aluminium plate, located on top of a cenotaph in the Ayp cemetery (near Ledra Palace), was placed in early 2010 and contains the names of the 419 people buried there between 1877 and 1931. This plate, probably the only one of its kind in a cemetery in Cyprus, is shown below:

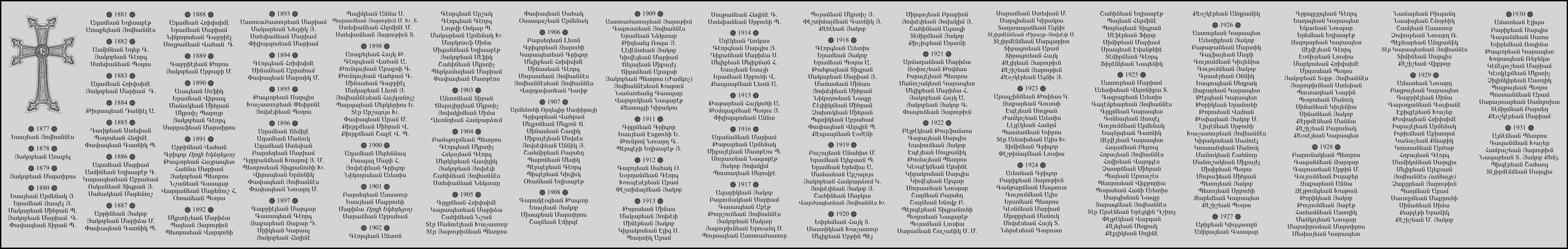
The inscription on top of the cenotaph at the old Armenian cemetery in Nicosia

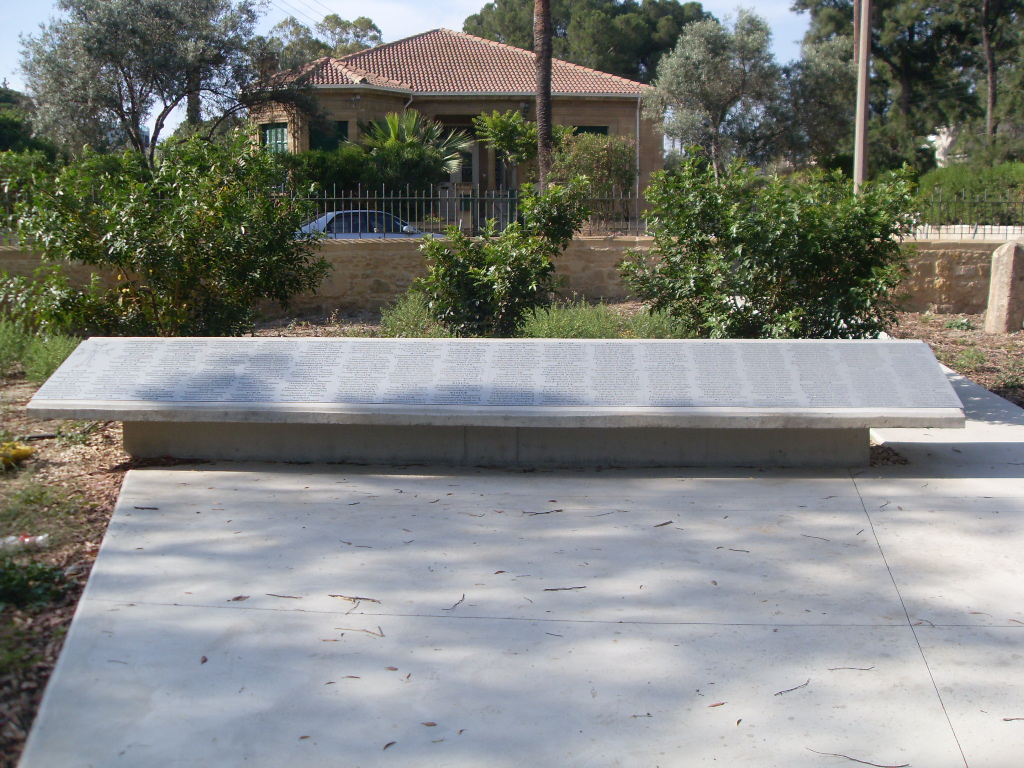
Commemorative plate at the old Armenian cemetery of Nicosia

Finally, in the old Armenian complex on Victoria street (nowadays in the Turkish-occupied Nicosia sector) was located the first Armenian Genocide monument in Cyprus. The monument was constructed using mortar in 1932 by architect Garo Balian and is considered to be the second oldest of its kind in the world. It was inaugurated on 24 April 1932 by Archbishop Bedros Saradjian and was also, unofficially, dedicated to the fallen of the famous Battle of Arara. The monument bore the following inscription in Armenian:

Յիշատակարան մէկ միլիոն Հայ նահատակաց 24 Ապրիլ 1915ի կանգնեցաւ կոթողս 24 Ապրիլ 1932 ի Կիպրոս (Memorial of one million Armenian martyrs of 24 April 1915 this obelisk was erected on 24 April 1932 in Cyprus)

All that survives of it today is its base, as the obelisk was taken down by the Turkish soldiers, who defaced its base. Until 2011, it bore a stencilled quote of Mustafa Kemal Atatürk, which was removed during the restoration of the Armenian compound.

== Melkonian ==
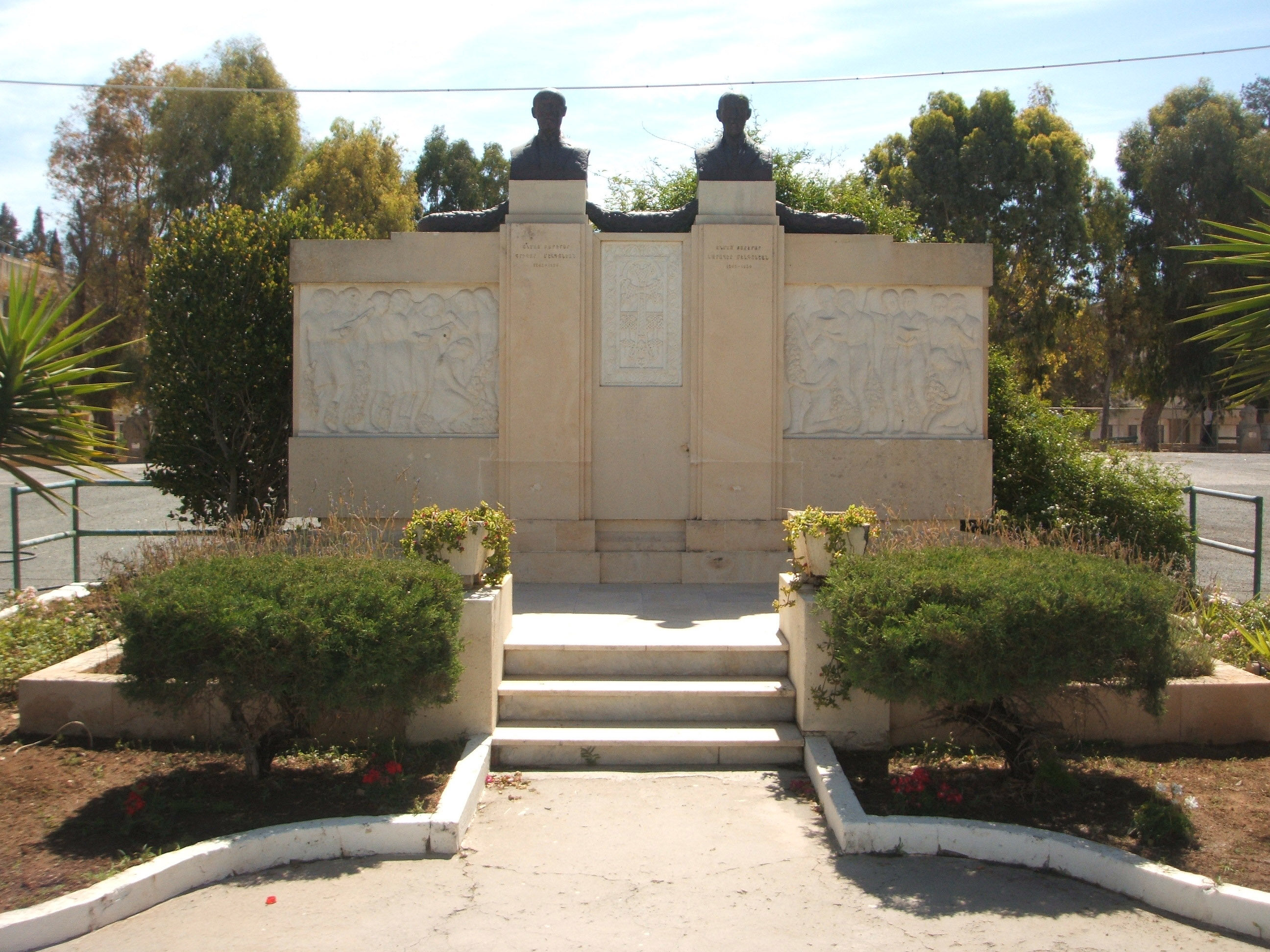
The Melkonian Brothers' Mausoleum

The white marble Benefactors' Mausoleum, with the bronze busts of Garabed Melkonian (1849–1934) and Krikor Melkonian (1843–1920), is located between the twin buildings, the work of French-Armenian sculptor Leon Mouradoff and French-Armenian architect Mardiros Altounian. It replaced an older, wooden trellis monument. Its foundation stone was laid on 24 April 1954 by Bishop Ghevont Chebeyian, who also inaugurated the Mausoleum on 15 January 1956. Under the bronze busts and on top of the monument there are the following inscriptions in Armenian:

Անմահ բարերար Գրիգոր Մելգոնեան 1842–1920 (Immortal benefactor Krikor Melkonian 1842–1920)

Անմահ բարերար Կարապետ Մելգոնեան 1849–1934 (Immortal benefactor Garabed Melkonian 1849–1934)

Between 1979 and 1980, artist Sebouh Abcarian constructed the twin sandstone monuments of the Armenian Alphabet and a synthesis resembling Mayr Hayastan; they were initially placed at the crossroads to the hospital and were inaugurated on 8 May 1981 by AGBU's President Alec Manougian. In 1987 they were placed in their current position, on the twin buildings' sides that face the Benefactors' Mausoleum. The Mother Armenia synthesis bears an inscription in Armenian, from Solomon's Book of Proverbs 1:2, said to be the first sentence written in Armenian by Saint Mesrob Mashdots after he devised the Armenian alphabet:

Ճանաչել զիմաստութիւն եւ զխրատ,իմանալ զբանս հանճարոյ (To know wisdom and instruction, to perceive the words of understanding)

Between 1990 and 1991, at the request of Melkonian's Headmaster Vahe Gabouchian, Armenian sculptor Levon Tokmadjian sculpted a series of 7 sandstone statues depicting important pillars of Armenian history and letters: Hovhannes Aivazovsky, Hagop Meghabard, Gomidas Vartabed Soghomonian, Saint Mesrob Mashdots, General Antranik Ozanian, Vahan Tekeyan and Movses Khorenatsi. This is what is written on the aluminium plaques below each statue:

Hovhannes Aivazovsky - Յովհաննէս Այվազովսկի (1817–1900) Great Armenian marine painter - Մեծ Հայ ծովանկարիչ

Hagop Meghabard - Յակոբ Մեղապարտ (15th–16th century) First Armenian printer - Առաջին Հայ տպագրիչ

Gomidas Vartabed - Կոմիտաս Վարդապետ (1869–1935) Great Armenian musician, composer and conductor - Մեծ Հայ երաժիշտ, երգահան եւ խմբավար

Մեսրոպ Մաշտոց 405 (Mesrob Mashdots 405)

General Antranik Ozanian - Զօրավար Անդրանիկ Օզանեան (1865–1927) Armenian National Hero, freedom fighter and military commander - Հայ Ազգային Հերոս ազատամարտիկ եւ հրամանատար

Vahan Tekeyan - Վահան Թէքէեան (1878–1948) Great Armenian poet and Melkonian teacher - Մեծ Հայ բանաստեղծ եւ Մելգոնեանի ուսուցիչ

Movses Khorenatsi - Մովսէս Խորենացի (410–490) Great Armenian historian of the “Golden Century” - Ոսկեդարի մեծ Հայ պատմիչ

The bust of Saint Mesrob Mashdots is placed on a small circular garden behind the Benefactors' Mausoleum, while the other busts are placed further back, closer to the new boarding section. Mashdots' bust does not have an aluminium plaque, as its inscription is carved on the sandstone itself.

Levon Tokmadjian also sculpted the marble bust of philanthropist and AGBU Chairman Alec Manougian (1901–1996), placed in front of the new boarding section. The marble inscription under the bust reads as follows:

Ալեք Մանուկեան - Alex Manoogian

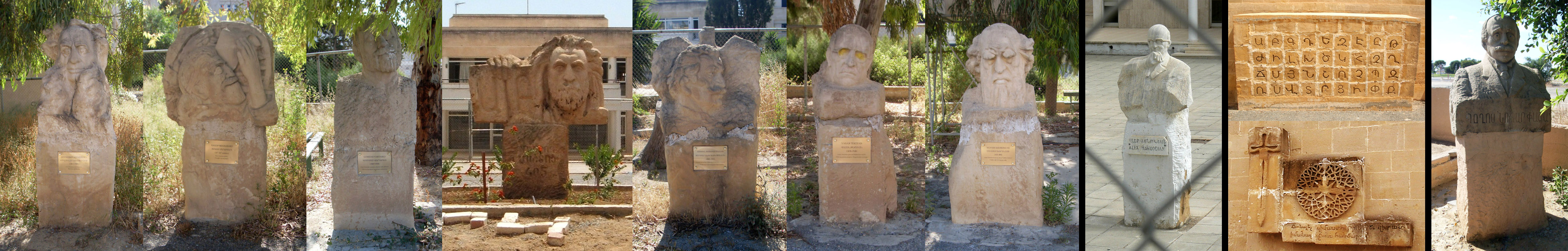
The series of sandstone statues at the Melkonian, the marble statue of Alec Manougian, the twin sandstone monument for the Armenian Alphabet and Mother Armenia and the sandstone bust of Boghos Noubar Pasha in front of the AGBU club entrance

== Larnaca ==
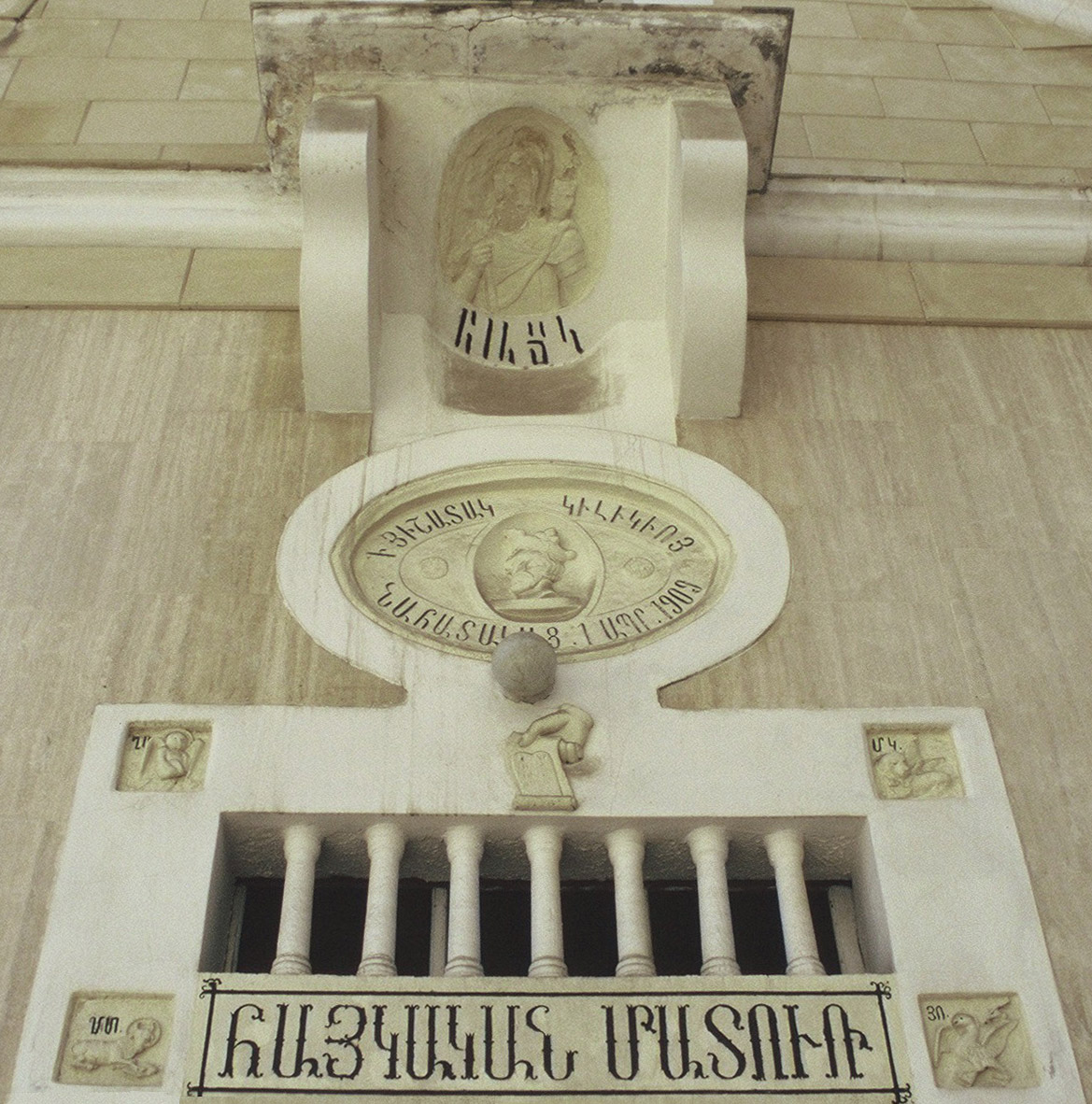
The commemorative façade of Sourp Stepanos church in Larnaca

The church of Sourp Stepanos (Saint Stephen) itself is considered to be the oldest monument of the Armenian massacres, built between 1909 and 1913 with a commemorative façade on its entrance. It was inaugurated on 20 May 1914 by Senior Archimandrite Serovpe Samvelian and was consecrated on 30 June 1918 by Archbishop Taniel Hagopian. The commemorative façade features the Armenian ethnarch Haig, the last King of the Armenian Kingdom of Cilicia, Levon V, a scroll held by a hand – representing the Ten Commandments and the four symbols of the Four Evangelists; around King Levon V, there is a commemorative inscription in Armenian:

Ի Յիշատակ Կիլիկիոյ Նահատակաց – 1 Ապր. 1909 (In Memory of the Cilician Martyrs – 1 April 1909)

while under the façade and above the entrance it says:

Հայկական Մատուռ (Armenian Chapel)

In the courtyard of Sourp Stepanos (Saint Stephen) is the reddish brown tuff stone khachkar (cross-stone) dedicated to the 100th anniversary of the Adana massacre and the myriads of Armenian martyrs. It was carved in Sisian province, Armenia by Grisha Avedissian and was donated by Mihran and Jacqueline Boyadjian. It was consecrated by Archbishop Varoujan Hergelian on 25 December 2011. It bears the following inscription in Armenian:

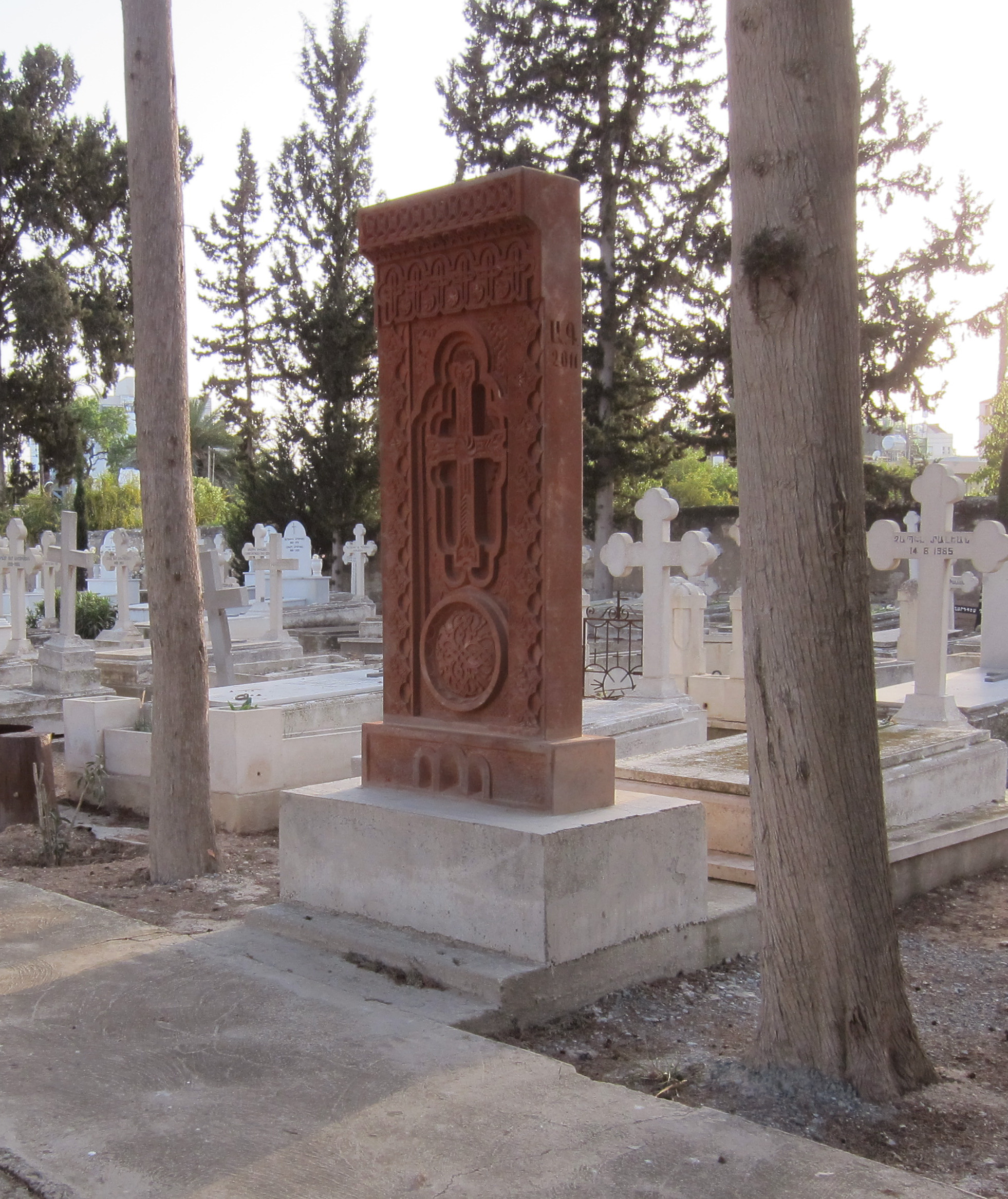
The khachkar at the Armenian cemetery in Larnaca

Ատանայի կոտորածի 100ամեակ 1909–2009 յուշարձան բիւրաւոր նահատակացն ազգիս Հայոց (Centennial of Adana massacre 1909–2009 monument of the myriads of martyrs of the Armenian nation)

On the upper right-hand side of the khachkar, there is the following inscription in Armenian, the sculptor's initials:

Գ. Ա. [G(risha) A(vedissian)]

Another reddish brown tuff stone khachkar (cross-stone) is found at the Armenian cemetery of Larnaca. It is dedicated to all the deceased of the Armenian nation in Larnaca. It was carved in Sisian province, Armenia by Grisha Avedissian and was donated by Kegham Boghossian. It was consecrated by Archbishop Varoujan Hergelian and Fr. Masdhots Ashkarian on 26 February 2012. Carved behind the khachkar is the following inscription in Armenian:

Նւէր (sic) Պետոյեան եւ Պողոսեան (sic) ընտանիքներու կողմանէ 2011 թ (Gift by the Bedoyian and Boghossian families in 2011)

Underneath the carved inscription is the following inscription on an aluminium plate:

Ի յիշատակ համայն ննջեցելոց ազգիս Հայոց Լառնագա (In memory of all deceased of the Armenian nation in Larnaca)

On the upper right-hand side of the khachkar, there is the following inscription in Armenian, the sculptor's initials:

Գ. Ա. [G(risha) A(vedissian)]

The Armenian Genocide Memorial is adjacent to the Larnaca marina, marking the spot where thousands of Armenian genocide refugees first set foot in Cyprus. A joint project by the governments of Cyprus and Armenia, it was designed by architect and town planner Angelos Demetriou with the help of the architect Michael Thrassou and sculpted by Greek artist Georgios Kalakallas. Its foundation stone was laid on 24 November 2006 by Armenian President Robert Kocharyan and it was unveiled on 28 May 2008 by Cypriot President Demetris Christofias. It features a bronze eagle-like monument, surrounded by rows of pomegranate and cypress trees.

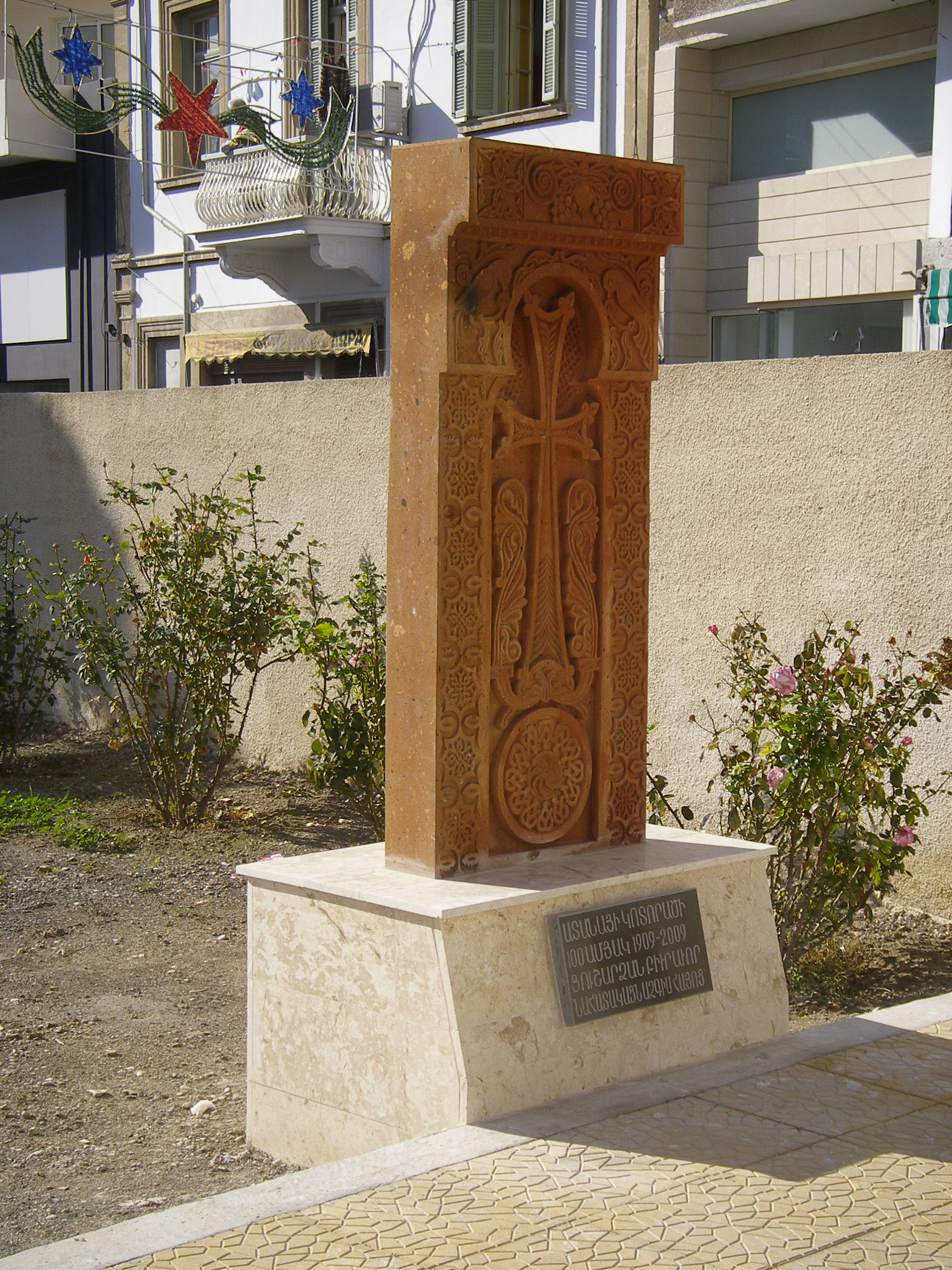
The khachkar in the courtyard of Sourp Stepanos

The four granite plaques at the base of the sculpture describing the monument were made by the government of Armenia. They read:

Το μνημείο αυτό υποδεικνύει το σημείο όπου Αρμένιοι πρόσφυγες, διαφεύγοντας τις διώξεις της Γενοκτονίας του 1915, πρωτοπάτησαν στην Κύπρο. Το μνημείο αποτελεί έκφραση ευγνωμοσύνης στο λαό της Κύπρου για τη συμπαράσταση και βοήθειά του προς τους πρόσφυγες αυτούς και είναι αφιερωμένο στη μνήμη των αμέτρητων θυμάτων της Αρμενικής Γενοκτονίας. (in Greek)

This monument marks the spot where Armenian refugees feeling persecution during the Genocide of 1915 first landed in Cyprus. It represents the gratitude of the Armenian nation towards the people of Cyprus for their assistance and generosity to those refugees and stands in memory of the countless victims of the Armenian Genocide. (in English)

Այս հուշարձանը կեր է խոյանում այն վայրում, ուր 1915 թվականի ցեղասպանության կոտորածներից մազապուրծ հազարավոր Հայեր առաջին անգամ ոտք դրեցին Կիպրոս։ Այն արտահայտում է Հայ ազգի երախտագիտությունը Կիպրոսի ժողովրդին՝ իր բարեսրտության եվ օգնության համար։ Այս հուշարձանը հավերժացնում է Մեծ Եղեռնի անթիվ նահատակների հիշատակը: (in Armenian)

Bu anıt 1915 soykırımının katliamlarından zor kurtarılmış binlerce Ermeninin (sic) Kıbrıs'ta ilk defa ayak bastıkları yeri gösterir. O Kıbrıs halkına kendi iyi kalpliliği ve yardımı için Ermeni halkının minnet duygularını ifade eder ve burada Ermeni soykırımının sayısız kurbanlarının anısına dikilir. (in Turkish)

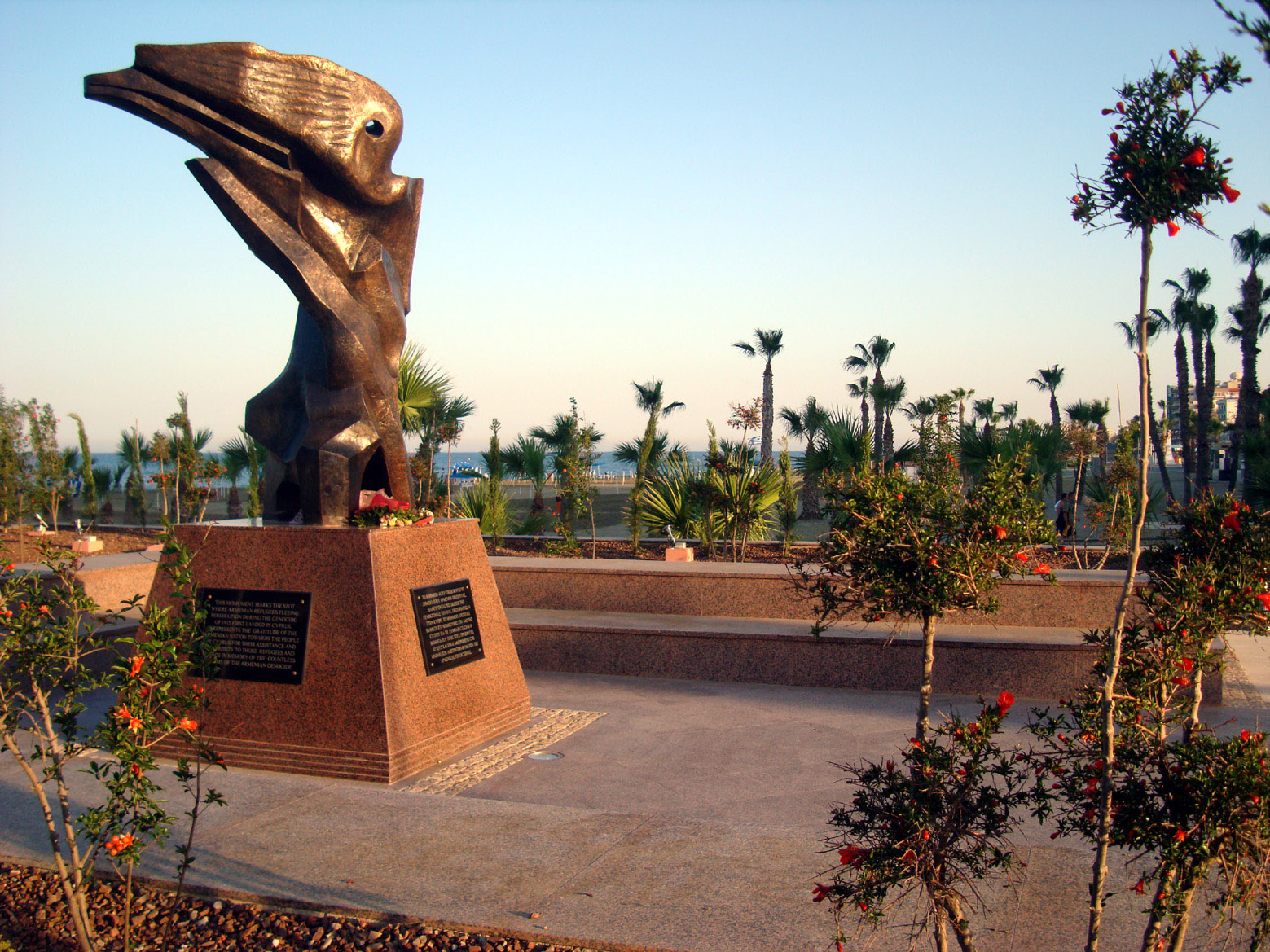
The Armenian Genocide memorial in Larnaca

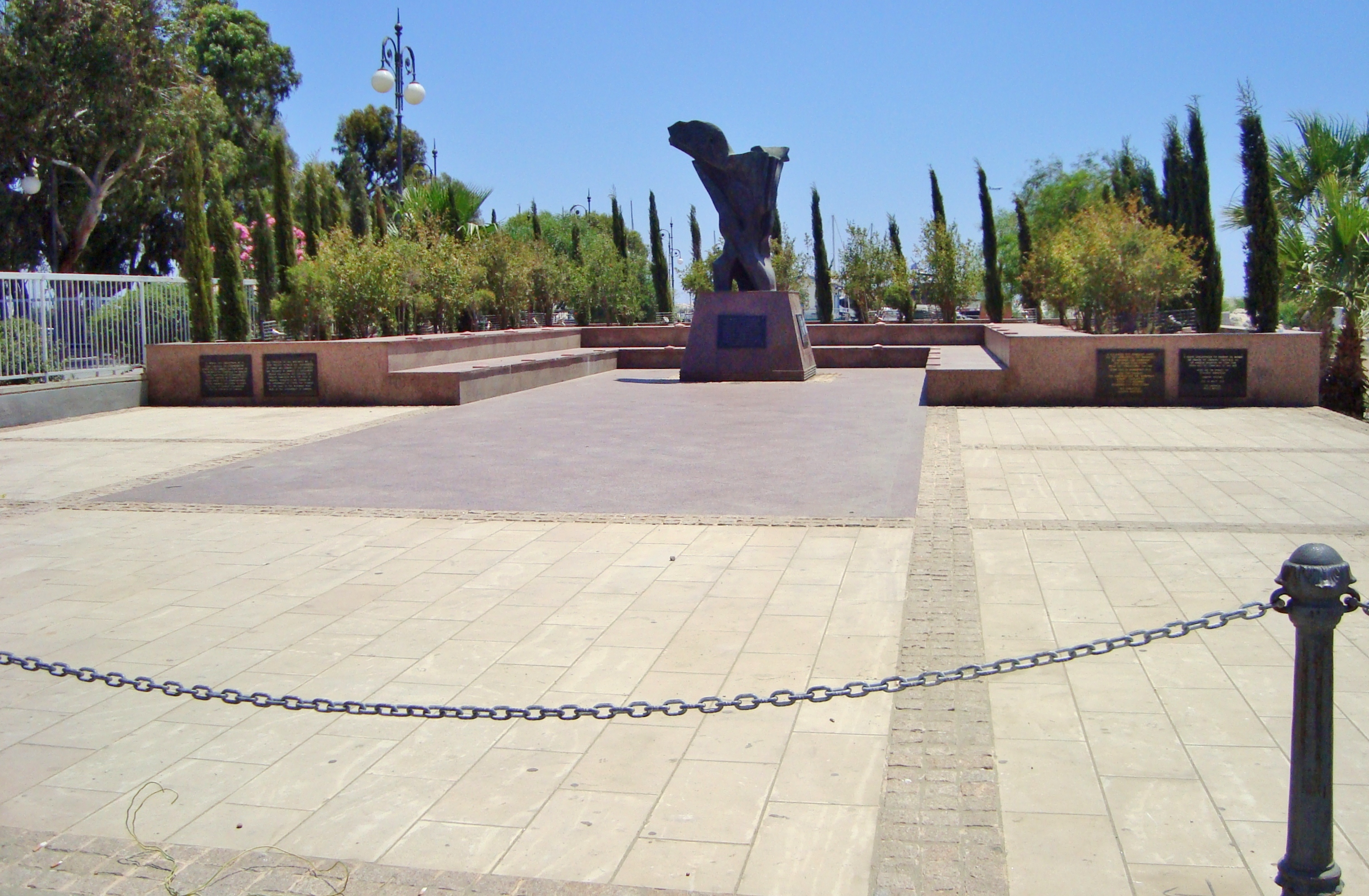
The Armenian Genocide memorial compound

On the left and the right of the compound surrounding the monument are four granite plaques, made by the government of Armenia. They read (from left to right):

Το μνημείο αυτό δημιουργήθηκε με τη στενή συνεργασία των κυβερνήσεων της Κύπρου και της Αρμενίας και πήρε μορφή με την έμπνευση και πρωτοβουλία του Βουλευτή Πετρός Καλαϊτζιάν και τη σχεδίαση του Άγγελου Δημητρίου με τη βοήθεια του Μιχαήλ Θράσου. Το έργο χρηματοδοτήθηκε από την κυβέρνηση της Κύπρου. Οι πλάκες στη βάση του μνημείου προσφέρθηκαν από την κυβέρνηση της Αρμενίας (in Greek)

The creation of this monument was a joint project between the governments of Cyprus and Armenia. It was inspired and initiated by Member of Parliament Bedros Kalaydjian and designed by Angelos Demetriou with the help of Michael Thrassou. It was funded by the government of Cyprus. The plaques at the base of the monument were made by the government of Armenia (in English)

Η κατάθεση του θεμέλιου λίθου για την δημιουργία του μνημείου εις μνήμην των Αρμενίων που ήρθαν στην Κύπρο μετά τη Γενοκτονία του 1915 έγινε στις 24 Νοεμβρίου 2006 από τον Πρόεδρο της Δημοκρατίας της Αρμενίας Robert Kocharyan κατά την επίσημη επίσκεψή του στην Κύπρο επί δημαρχίας Ανδρέα Μωϋσέως (in Greek) (The laying of the foundation stone for the creation of the monument in memory of the Armenians who came to Cyprus after the 1915 Genocide was made on 24 November 2006 by the President of Armenia Robert Kocharyan during his official visit in Cyprus during the mayorship of Andreas Moyseos)

Η τελετή αποκαλυπτηρίων του μνημείου εις μνήμην των θυμάτων της Αρμενικής Γενοκτονίας και των Αρμενίων προσφύγων που ήλθαν στην Κύπρο κατά τη Γενοκτονία του 1915 – 1923 έγινε από τον Πρόεδρο της Κυπριακής Δημοκρατίας Δημήτρη Χριστόφια στις 28 Μαΐου 2008 επί δημαρχίας Ανδρέα Μωϋσέως (in Greek) (The unveiling ceremony of the monument in memory of the victims of the Armenian Genocide and the Armenian refugees who came to Cyprus during the 1915 – 1923 Genocide was made by the President of the Republic of Cyprus Demetris Christofias on 28 May 2008 during the mayorship of Andreas Moyseos)

The square in front of the Memorial was funded by the Kalaydjian Foundation and links the Armenian Genocide Monument with Larnaca's main promenade.

== Limassol ==
A dark brown tuff stone khachkar (cross-stone) was placed outside the Sourp Kevork (Saint George) church in 2008, as a donation from the Arakelyan family. It was carved in Gyumri and was unveiled on 28 September 2008 by Archbishop Varoujan Hergelian. On its base, there is the inscription in English:

From Arakelyans family

== Magaravank ==
There are two monuments at Sourp Magar. The first one is a mortar obelisk dedicated to Abbot Mekhitar, his visit there in 1695 and the 200th anniversary of the formation of the Mekhitarist Order. It was originally erected in 1901, as a pile of stones, by the students of the National Educational Orphanage, run by Vahan Kurkjian (Pagouran); the inaugural ceremony was performed on 8 September 1901. Thirty years after this, the monument was re-constructed by 4 former students of the Orphanage (Movses Soultanian, Simon Vanian, Armen Bedevian, Rapael Pilibbossian), with the help of architect Garo Balian, and was unveiled on 2 August 1931 by Catholicos Sahag Khabayan and Archbishop Bedros Saradjian.

There are two inscriptions in Armenian on the monument; the Armenian inscription on the eastern side of the monument is a poem by Vahan Kurkjian and it reads:

ՄԽԻԹԱՐԱՅ ԲԼՈՒՐ - Ողջո՜յն քեզ բլուր, բնութեան տաճար, յիշատակ թողումք կոթողդ կարկառ նորընծայ անունդ պահէ՛ դարէ դար, կեցցէ՛ լուսաշող մեծն Մխիթար։ Վ.Քիւրքճեան (MEKHITAR’S HILL - Hail to you hill, temple of nature, may this stone monument be a memorial that preserves your holy name from century to century, long live the radiant great Mehhitar. Vahan Kurkjian)

The western side of the monument has the following inscription in Armenian:

8 Սեպտ.1901 – Ի յիշատակ երկհարիւրամեակի Մխիթար Աբբահօր. Աշակերտք Ազգ.Կրթ.-Որբանոցի Նիկոսիոյ. Վերականգնեցաւ նախկին 4 աշակերտաց կողմէ - Մ.Ս.,Ս.Վ.,Ա.Պ.,Ռ.,Փ. 1931 (8 September 1901 – In memory of the two hundredth anniversary of Abbot Mekhitar. The students of the National Educational Orphanage of Nicosia. Restored by 4 former students Movses Soultanian, Simon Vanian, Armen Bedevian, Raphael Philippossian 1931)

The other monument is a stone column, located at the monastery's square and dedicated to the visit of Catholicos Sahag II there and the opening of the square in 1933; it was unveiled by himself on 8 September 1933. The inscription on the column, in Armenian reads:

Բացաւ հրապարակս այս արդեամբ եւ ըղձիւք Մեծին Բ. Սահակայ Վեհին Կիլիկիոյ ի յիշատակ այցելութեան ի Վանս, 8 Սեպ. 1933 (This square was opened by commission and desire of the Great Catholicos of Cilicia Sahag II in memory of his visit to this Monastery, 8 September 1933)

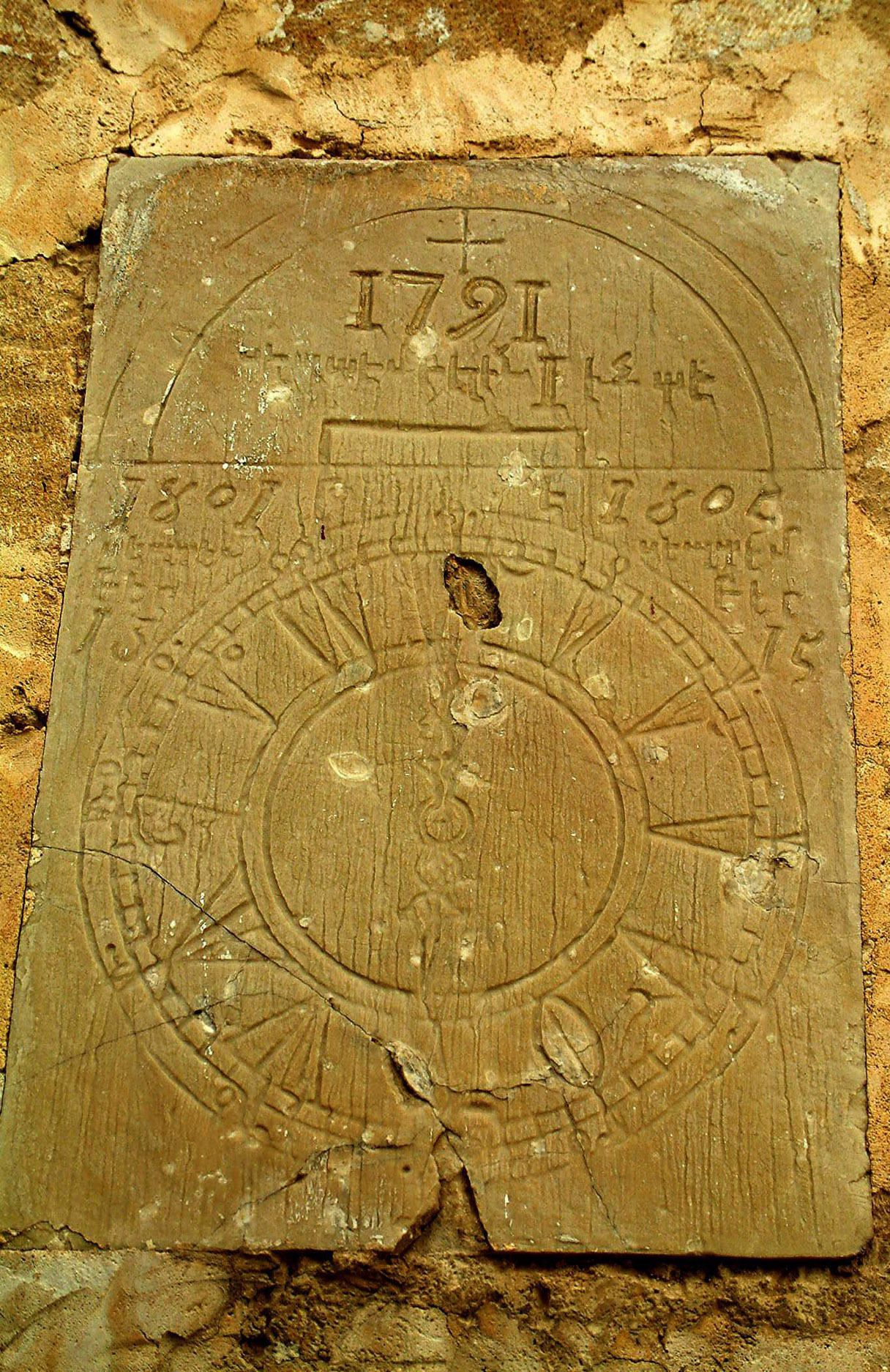
The oldest known Armenian inscription in Cyprus

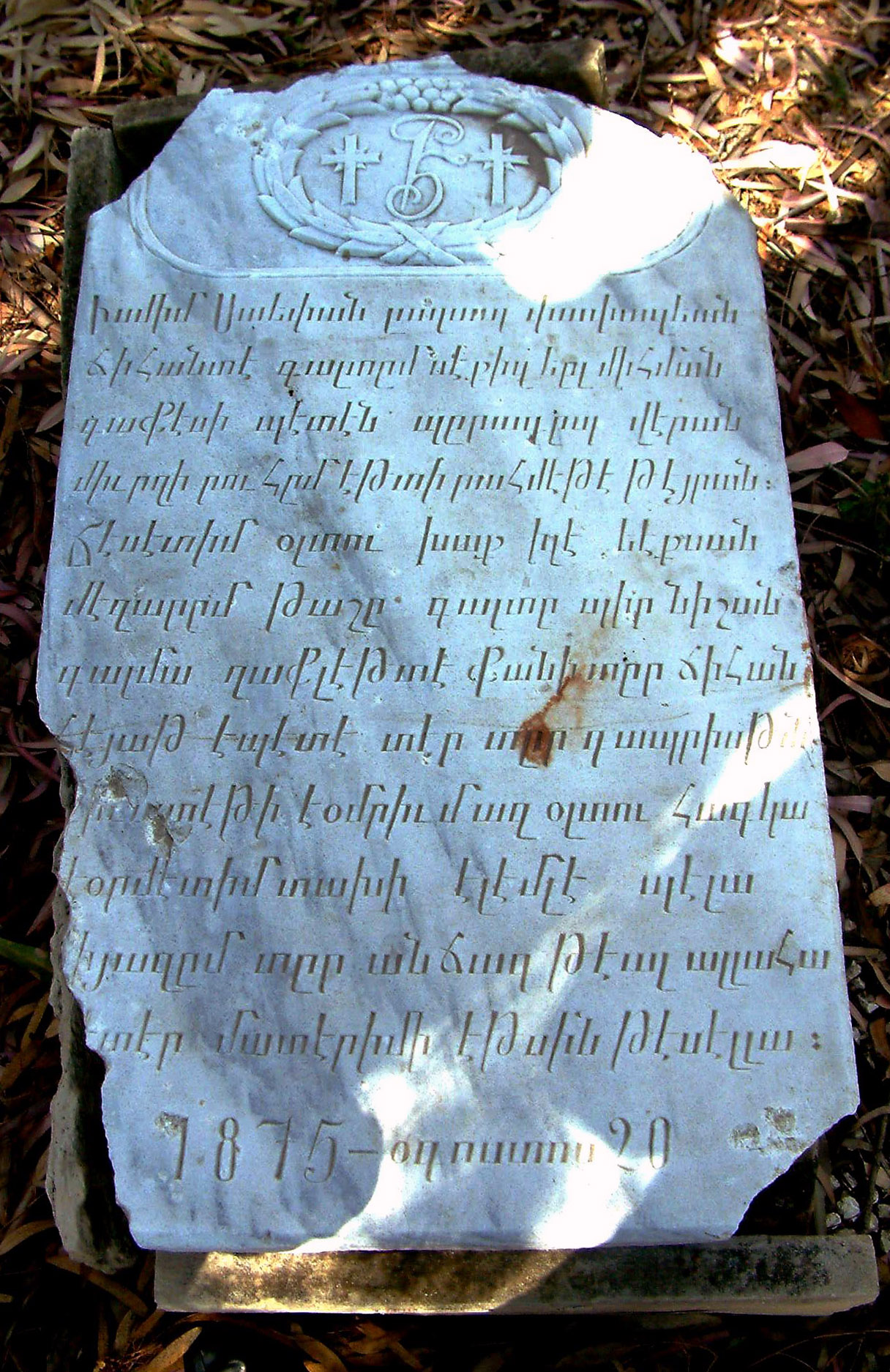
The oldest known Armenian tombstone in Cyprus

== Others (including no longer existing) ==
Unfortunately, no Armenian inscriptions survive in Cyprus before the Ottoman Era.

The sundial on the left is the oldest known Armenian inscription in Cyprus. Located in Turkish-occupied Nicosia, it marks the entrance of the old Sinanian house, owned by Yevnige Sinanian, who lived there with her sister Eojenie. They inherited it from their parents, Apraham and Sima Sinanian; Apraham Sinanian (1844–1894) was from Yozgat, whereas Sima Philibbosian (1859–1929) was a native Armenian-Cypriot, the daughter of Philip Sdepanian and Yeghsapet Ohanian and the great-great-granddaughter of the famous Sarkis Agha; there is mention that some of her ancestors perhaps came from Caesarea at an uncertain period. What the dates mean is uncertain, but perhaps 1791 is the year that Sima's maternal family first came to Cyprus.

The tombstone on the right is the oldest known Armenian tombstone in Cyprus. Located in the Ayp cemetery, it is a poem dedicated to the young Sdepan Papazian (1867–1875), the only son (and second of three children) of Negdarine Eramian (1842–1909) and Ohannes Papazian (1832–1896); while Ohannes was born in Yerzinga, Negdarine was the daughter of Boghos Eramian – an Armenian-Cypriot landowner and once the Head Treasurer from Pano Deftera – and Yeghsapet Sdepanian. Yeghsapet was the daughter of Sdepan Agha Krikorian and Heghine Boghossian, and the great-granddaughter of the famous Sarkis Agha.

In both inscriptions, even though the letters used are Armenian, the language is Turkish; the use of the Armenian script to write Turkish was common amongst Ottoman Armenians, called հայատառ թրքերէն (hayadar trkeren, Turkish in Armenian letters). In fact, the first Turkish novel to be published in the Ottoman Empire was Akabi Hikâyesi (Akabi's story), written in 1851 with the Armenian script by Vartan Pasha.

Other than the monuments mentioned above, in the past there were also other Armenian monuments in Cyprus:

- a heap monument dedicated to Abbot Mekhitar on top of the hill overlooking the Magaravank (1901–1931). This monument was erected by the students of Vahan Kurkjian's (Pagouran) National Educational Orphanage on 8 September 1901. It was replaced in 1931 by the existing monument in exactly the same location.
- a wooden octagonal mausoleum in memory of the Melkonian brothers (1935–1955). This light blue trellis mausoleum was erected by the students and was originally located behind the existing mausoleum, by which it was replaced in 1955. Subsequently, it was moved for a few years to the side of the girls' building and was painted silver. Circa 1963, it was moved to the location of the present football stadium and was used as changing room for the boys, until it fell to pieces a few years later.
- a cement monument in memory of the 40th anniversary of Melkonian's 7th Scout Group (1972–1989). The monument's design and drawing was done by student Sarkis Tossounian. The design was two hands clamping (like arm wrestling), as a symbol of unity for all the scouts in and around Cyprus. It was unveiled on 16 April 1972, by Chief Scout Commissioner Demetris Demetriou. It was located where the scouts' building was and was taken down with the construction of the new buildings.
- a stone monument in memory of the 45th anniversary of the 7th Scout Group (1976–1987). The design of this monument, along with the scout emblem, was done by student Varouj Shehirian. The monument's construction finished in 1976 and it was unveiled on 12 April 1977, by Headmistress Sosse Bedigian and School Committee Vice-Chairman Hovhannes Sheohmelian. During the same period, the scouts erected a watchtower (դիտարան=tidaran) behind this monument, about 6 m. tall and with a rope ladder to climb. Both were located in the crossroads of the school's hospital and were taken down with the construction of the new boarding section.
- a cement eagle in front of the boys' building of the Melkonian Educational Institute (1981–1997). It was constructed by Sebouh Abcarian and it came apart.
- a marble plaque at the Acropolis Park in Strovolos, Nicosia (1982–1988), in memory of the 1.500.000 martyrs of the Armenian genocide. This was erected by the Armenian Ethnarchy and was placed at the western part of the park. It was unveiled on 24 April 1982 by Bishop Zareh Aznavorian and Archbishop Ardavazt Terterian. For various reasons, the monument was removed in 1988 and was kept at the basement of the Nicosia Nareg School until it was moved to the Kim cemetery in 2000. Today, it is broken into two pieces.

Finally, the Melkonian's 35m-tall water tower (in Armenian: ջրամբար, chrampar), although not a monument per se, was a landmark of the school from the time it was built until the mid–1980s, when it was pulled down due to structural and safety concerns. It cast into wooden moulds by Alexander Delyfer and had a capacity of 4 tons. The water tower became famous when Artin Kalousdian, a boarding student at the Melkonian from Constantinople, climbed it and committed suicide by falling from it in 1928. Legend has it that after his suicide, his classmates put his bed's springs on the water tower in his memory. The water tower was also decorated and lit in 1937 (for the coronation of King George VI) and in 1953 (for the coronation of Queen Elizabeth II).

== Gallery ==
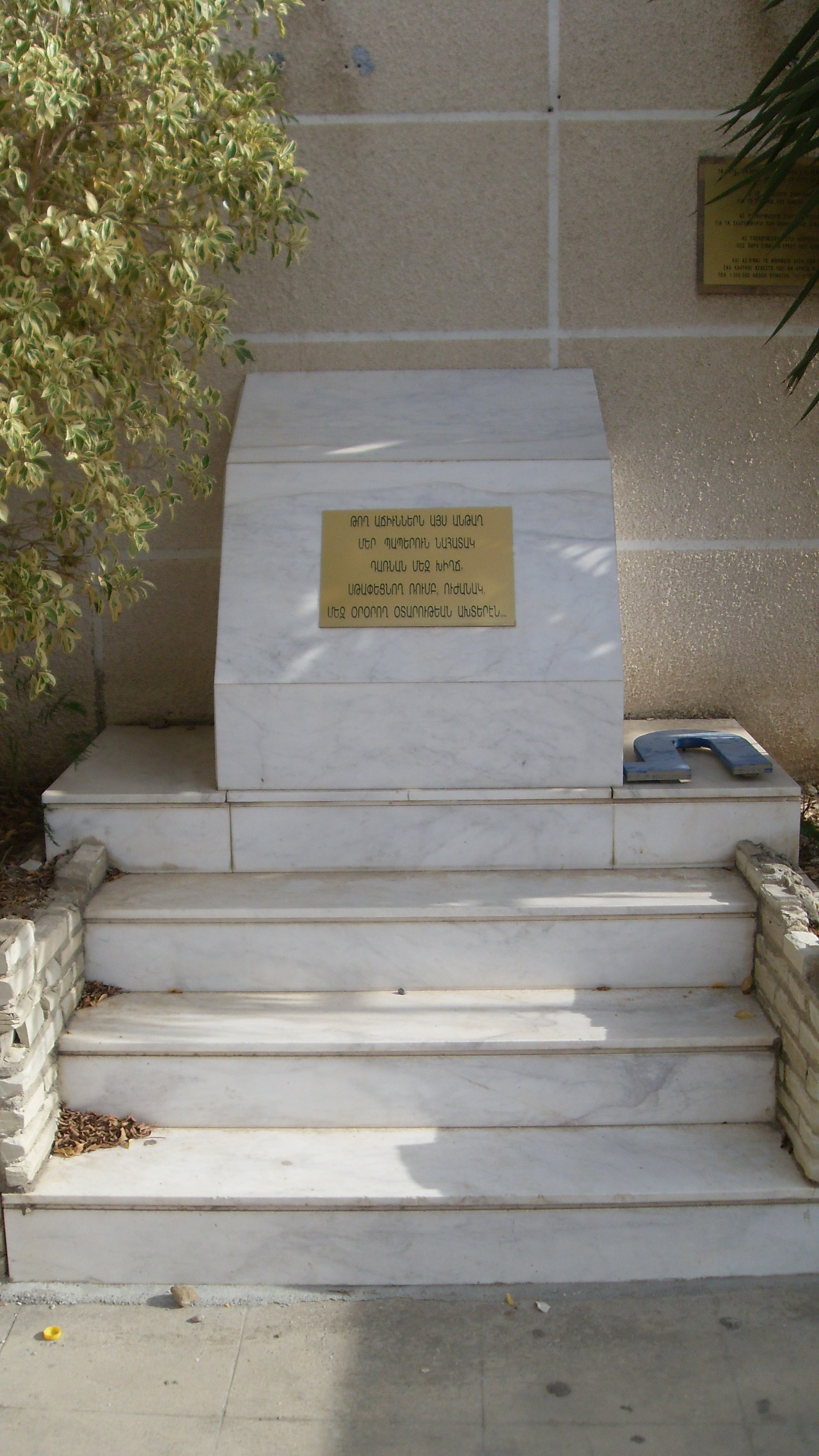
The tomb-ossuary in front of AYMA

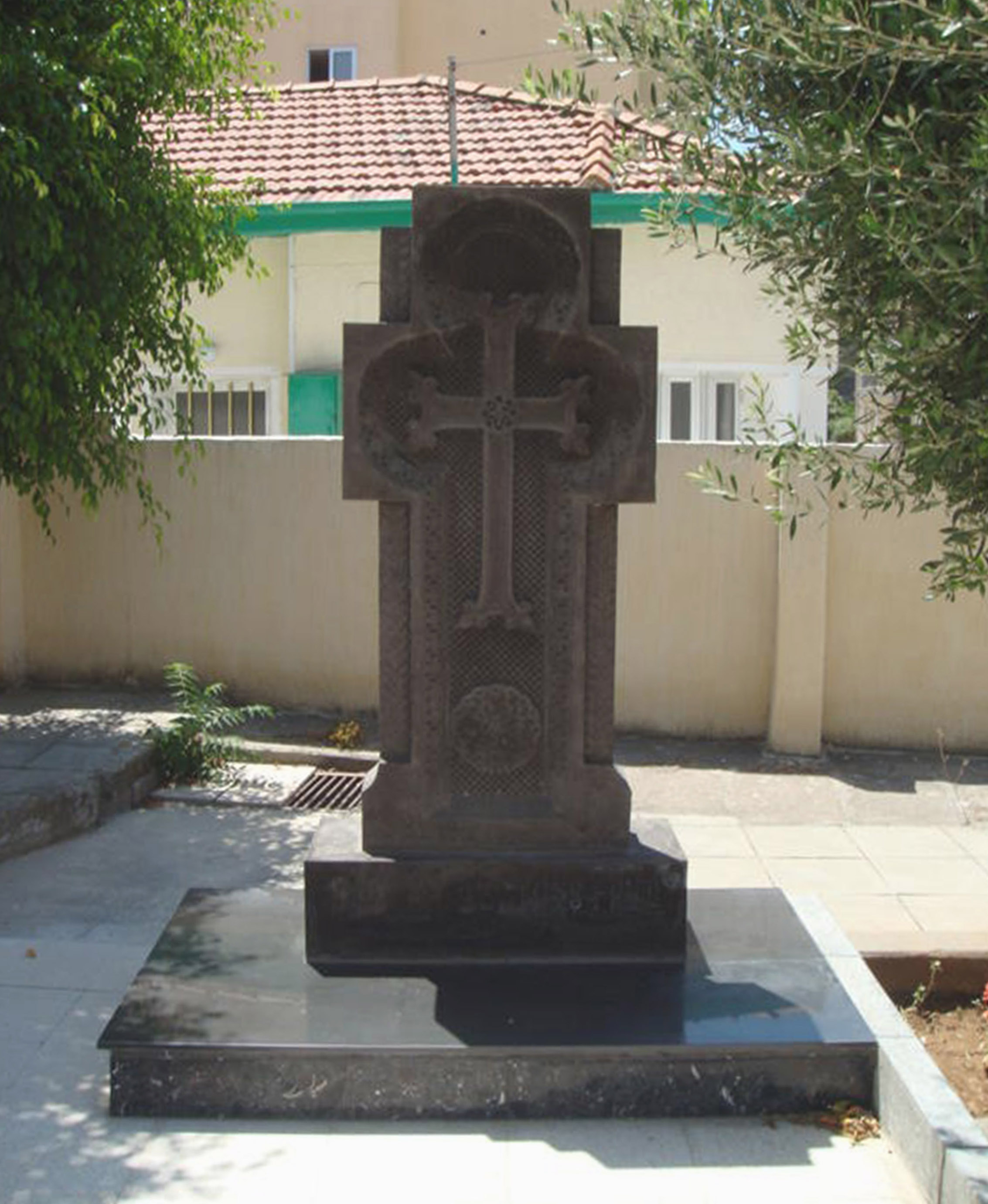
The khachkar in Limassol

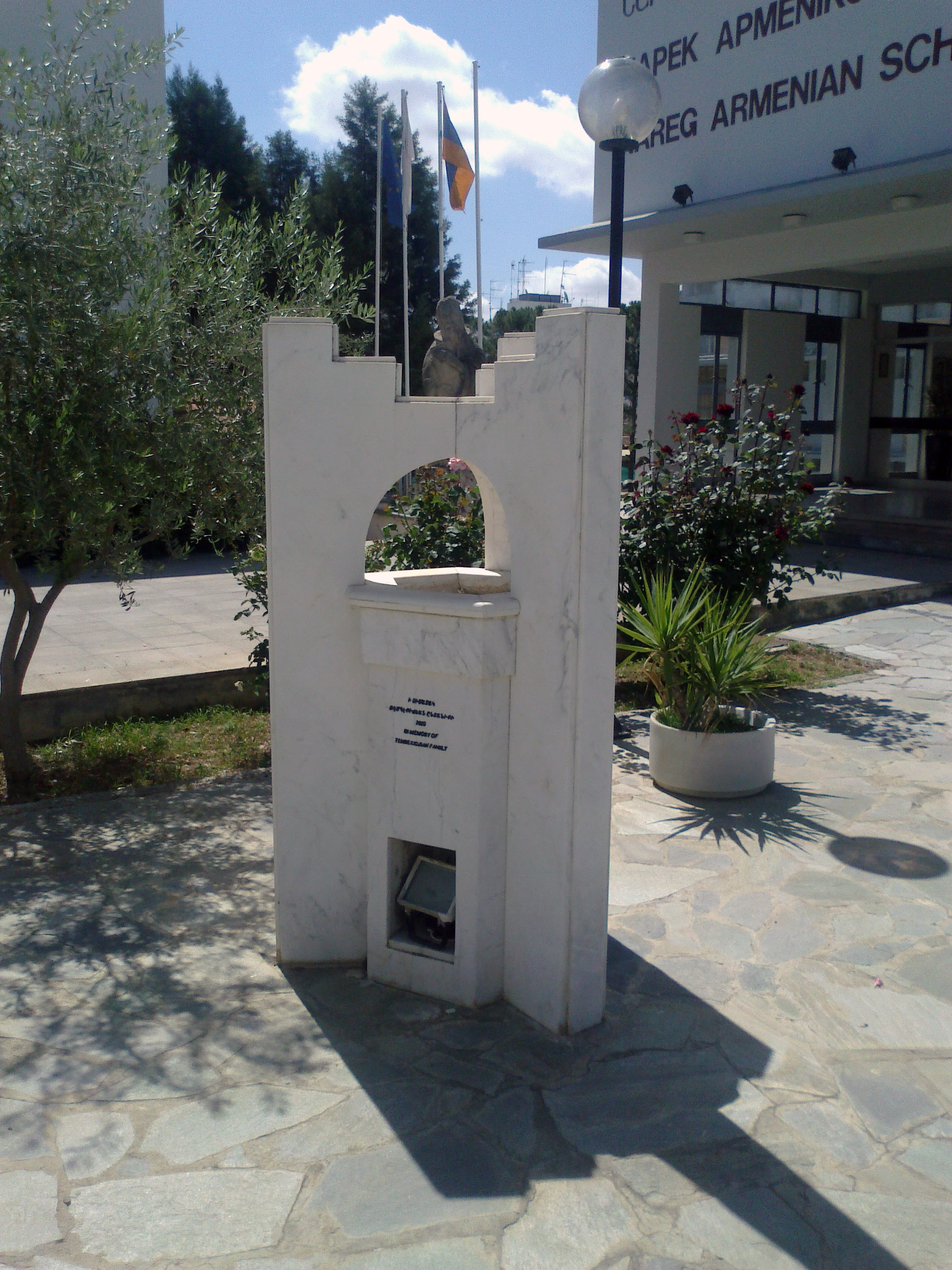
One of the two ossuaries in Nicosia

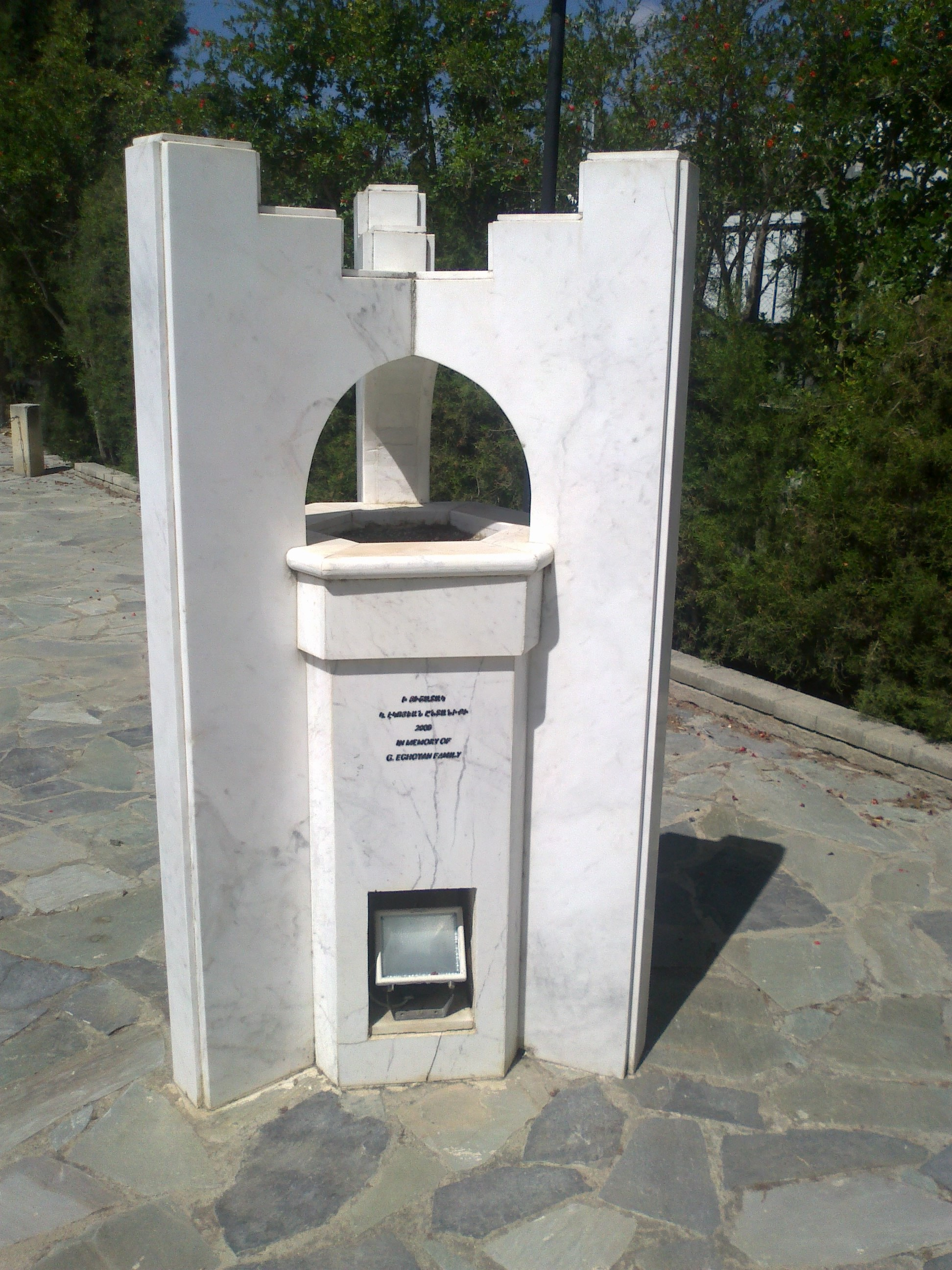
One of the two ossuaries in Nicosia
