= Armenian Genocide Memorial in Larnaca =

Coordinates: 34.9163°N 33.6385°E

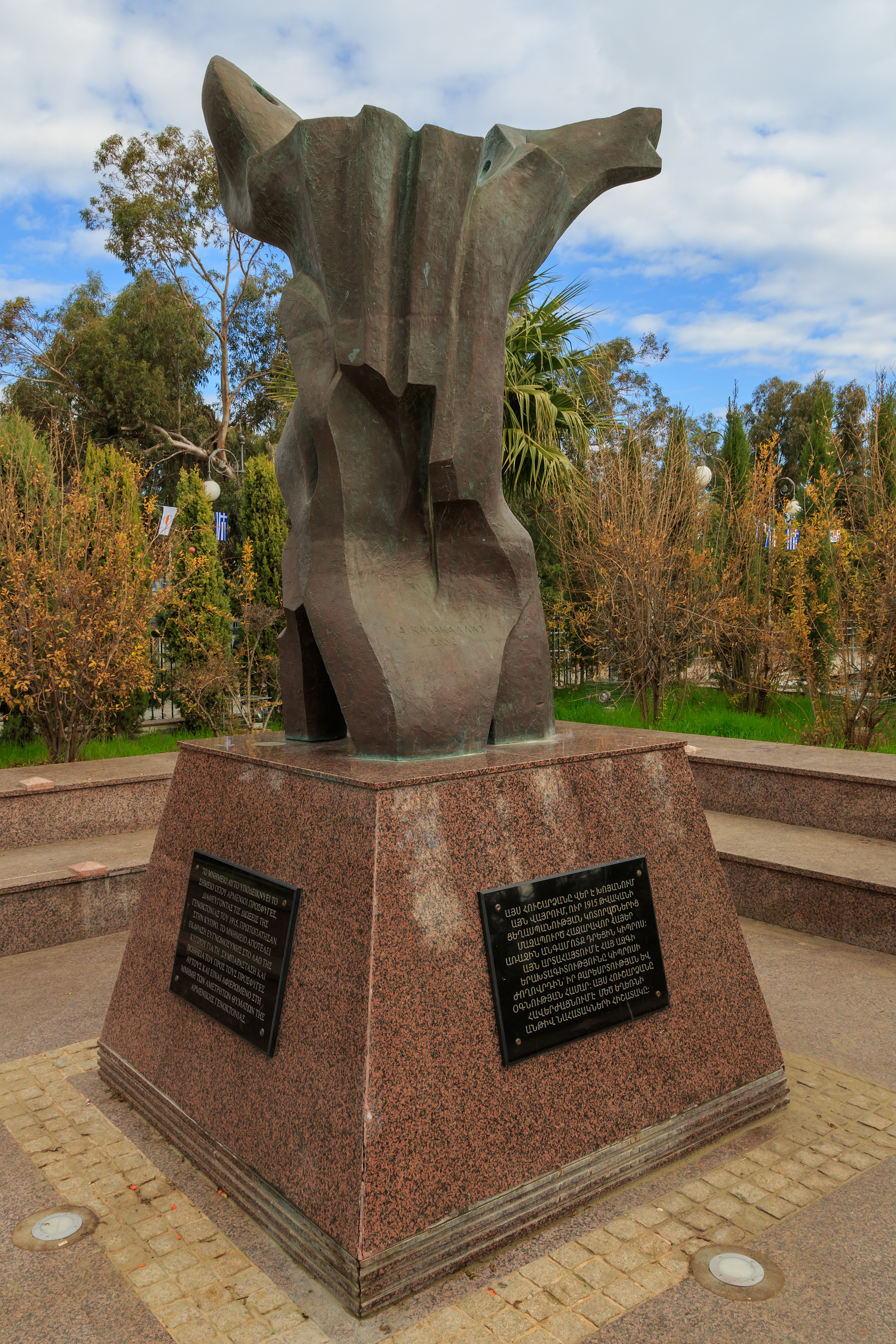

The Armenian Genocide Memorial in Larnaca, Cyprus, is a monument dedicated to the martyrs and survivors of the Armenian genocide of 1915-1923. It is located at Larnaca’s seafront and marks the spot where thousands of Armenian refugees fleeing the atrocities of the Genocide first landed in Cyprus (at Larnaca Port). Its position is adjacent to the entrance to Larnaca’s present-day marina.

The memorial also represents the gratitude of the Armenian nation towards the people of Cyprus for their generosity and assistance to the Armenian refugees.

== Creation ==
The creation of the Memorial was a joint project between the governments of Cyprus and Armenia and was initiated by the then Bedros Kalaydjian, MP (Representative of the Armenian Community in Cyprus. The Memorial was funded principally by the government of Cyprus. It was designed by the architect and town planner Angelos Demetriou with the help of the architect Michael Thrassou. It features a bronze monument surrounded by rows of pomegranate and cypress trees. The four granite plaques at the base of the sculpture (describing the monument in Greek, English, Armenian and Turkish) were made by the government of Armenia. The monument itself was sculpted by the Greek artist Georgios Kalakallas.

The square in front of the Memorial was funded by the Kalaydjian Foundation and links the Armenian Genocide Memorial with Larnaca’s main promenade.

On 24 November 2006, during the state visit to Cyprus of the President of Armenia, the Memorial’s foundation stone was laid by President Robert Kocharyan.

== Unveiling ==
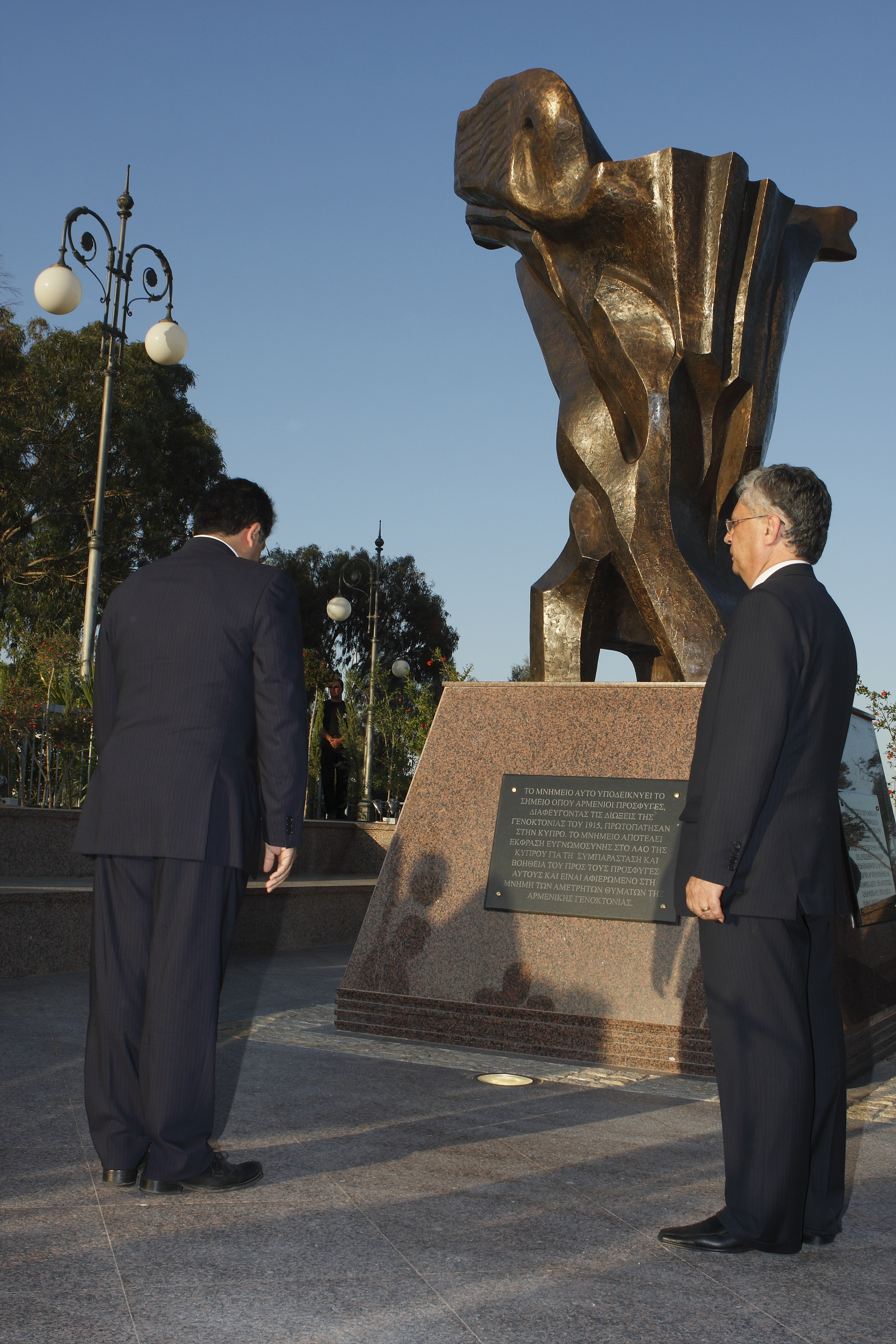
The Armenian Genocide Memorial in Larnaca on 28 May 2008

On 28 May 2008, the President of the Republic of Cyprus, Demetris Christofias, officially unveiled the Armenian Genocide Memorial in Larnaca. The solemn ceremony was attended by the Ambassador of Armenia, the Mayor of Larnaca, the Archbishop of the Armenian community in Cyprus, members of parliament, and thousands of Greek- and Armenian-Cypriots.

== See also ==
- Armenian genocide
- List of Armenian genocide memorials
- Armenian Genocide Remembrance Day
