= Armenian Genocide Monument in Nicosia =

Memorial

Coordinates: 35.15269°N 33.36729°E

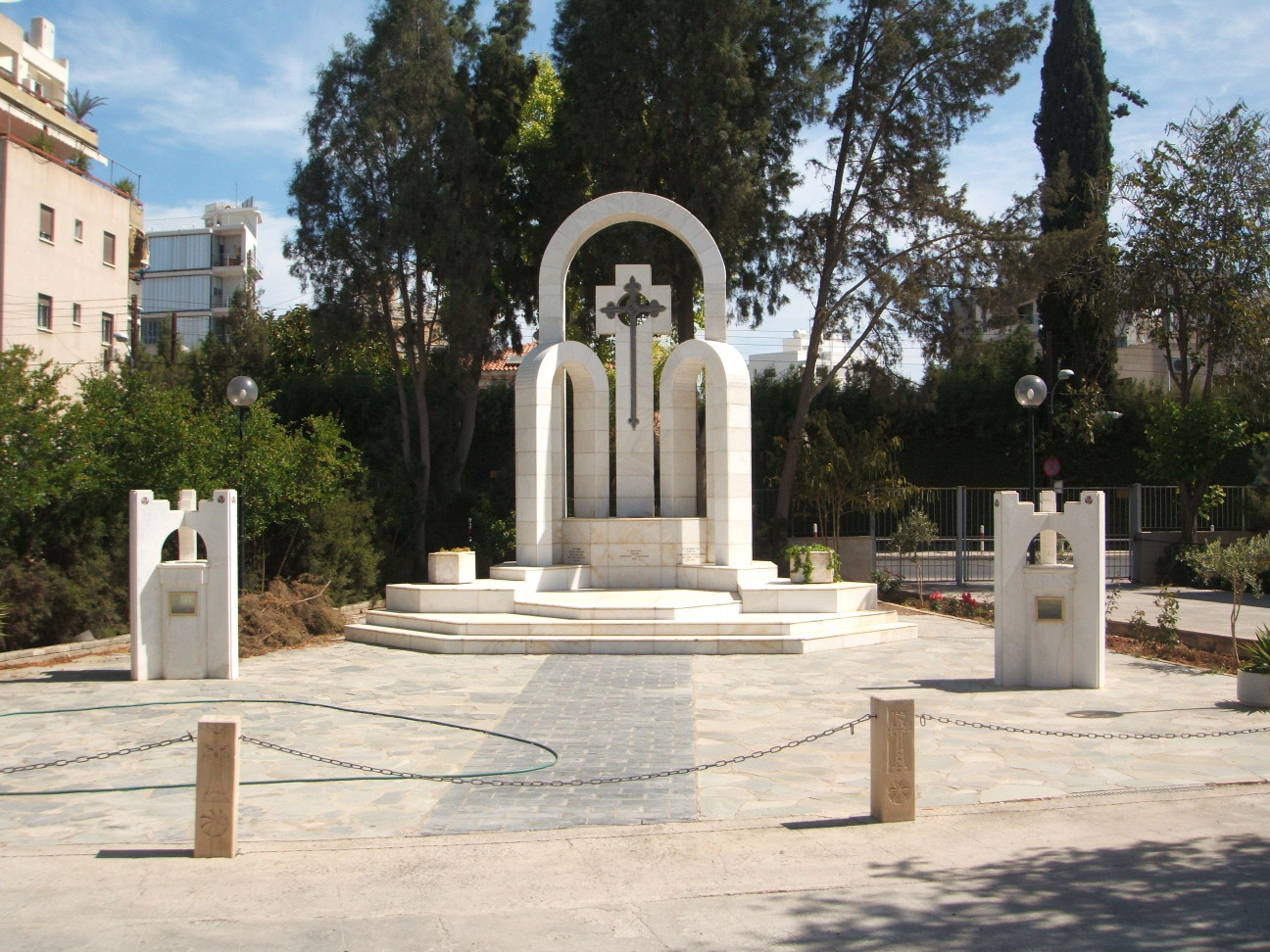
The Armenian Genocide Monument in Nicosia

The Armenian Genocide Monument in Nicosia, Cyprus, is a monument dedicated to the martyrs and the survivors of the Armenian genocide of 1915–1923. It is located within the Armenian complex on Armenia street in Acropolis, Strovolos, which contains the Armenian Prelature building, the Sourp Asdvadzadzin cathedral, the Nareg Armenian School, the marble khachkar, the bust of Archbishop Zareh Aznavorian and the statue of Gregory of Nareg.

== Creation ==
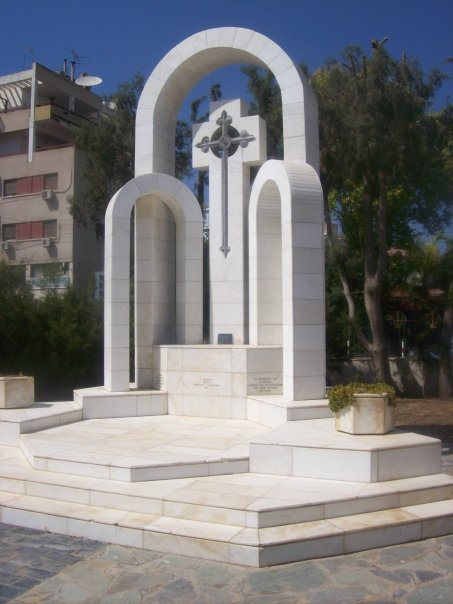

The creation of the monument was undertaken by the Armenian Prelature of Cyprus, so as to have a permanent Armenian genocide monument within the Armenia street compound. The foundation of the monument took place in 1985, on the 70th anniversary of the Armenian genocide, but at the time there was no timetable for the erection of this monument.

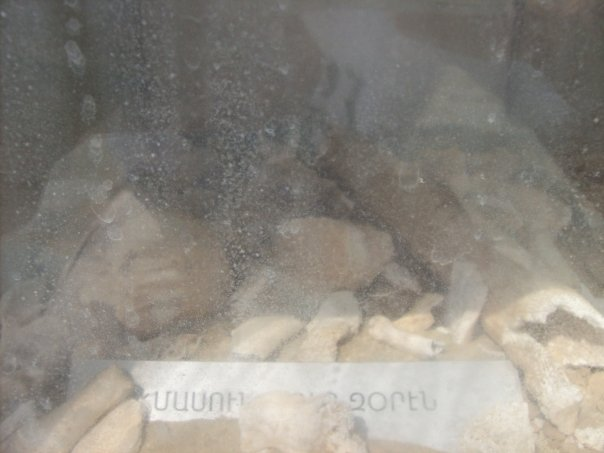
Bone fragments brought from Der Zor of victims of the Armenian genocide

In 1989, the Armenian Prelature selected this out of two designs submitted by well-known painter and architect, John Guevherian, and construction started in early 1990. It features three marble arches, representing Armenia, the Armenian Diaspora and Armenians within the former Soviet Union. In the centre of the central arch there is a black granite cross, sculpted by famous Armenian sculptor Levon Tokmadjian, who was a guest at the Melkonian Educational Institute at the time, commissioned to carve a series of busts for pillars of Armenian history and letters. The marble monument is positioned on a raised marble base and bears (from left to right) a Greek, Armenian and English inscription.

== Unveiling ==
The monument was unveiled by Senior Archimandrite Yeghishe Mandjikian on 24 April 1992, in the presence of a large number of people attending. In 1996 some bone remains of martyrs of the Armenian genocide brought by a delegation of the Armenian Relief Society from Markade, Deir ez-Zor desert, were interred within the monument. In 2000 more bone remains were placed within two reliquaries, built after the donation of the Eghoyian and Tembekidjian families, surrounded by five khachkar-like columns built after the donation of Anahid der Movsessian.

== See also ==
- List of Armenian genocide memorials
- Armenian Genocide Remembrance Day
