= Armenian education in Cyprus =

Education is the foundation for the preservation of Armenian national and cultural heritage. Armenian schools teach and cultivate Armenophony, Armenology, the age-old Armenian history and the rich Armenian traditions, thus ensuring the perpetuation of Armenianism from generation to generation. The very existence of Armenian educational institutions in the countries of the Armenian Diaspora shows exactly the importance, the perseverance and the tireless efforts that the numerous Armenian communities make to avoid the "white massacre", the assimilation and peaceful disintegration of the Armenian nation. Therefore, in a way, the continuance of Armenian education up to our days is a sign of victory against the "red massacre", the Genocide.

== History ==
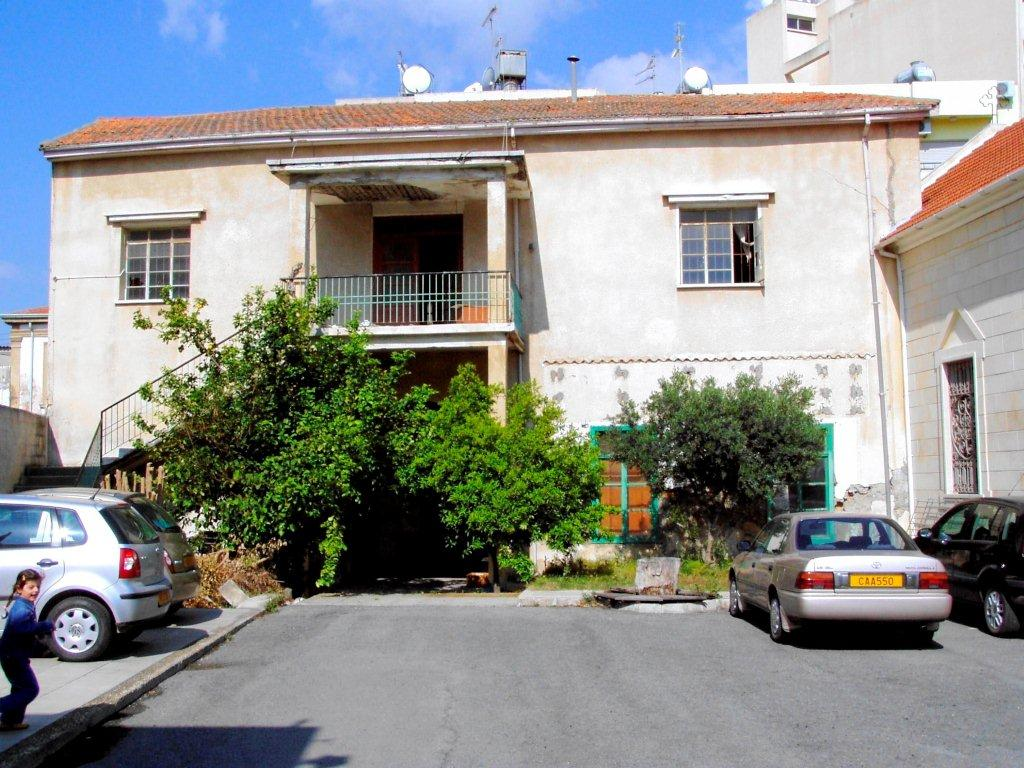
The old Larnaca Armenian school

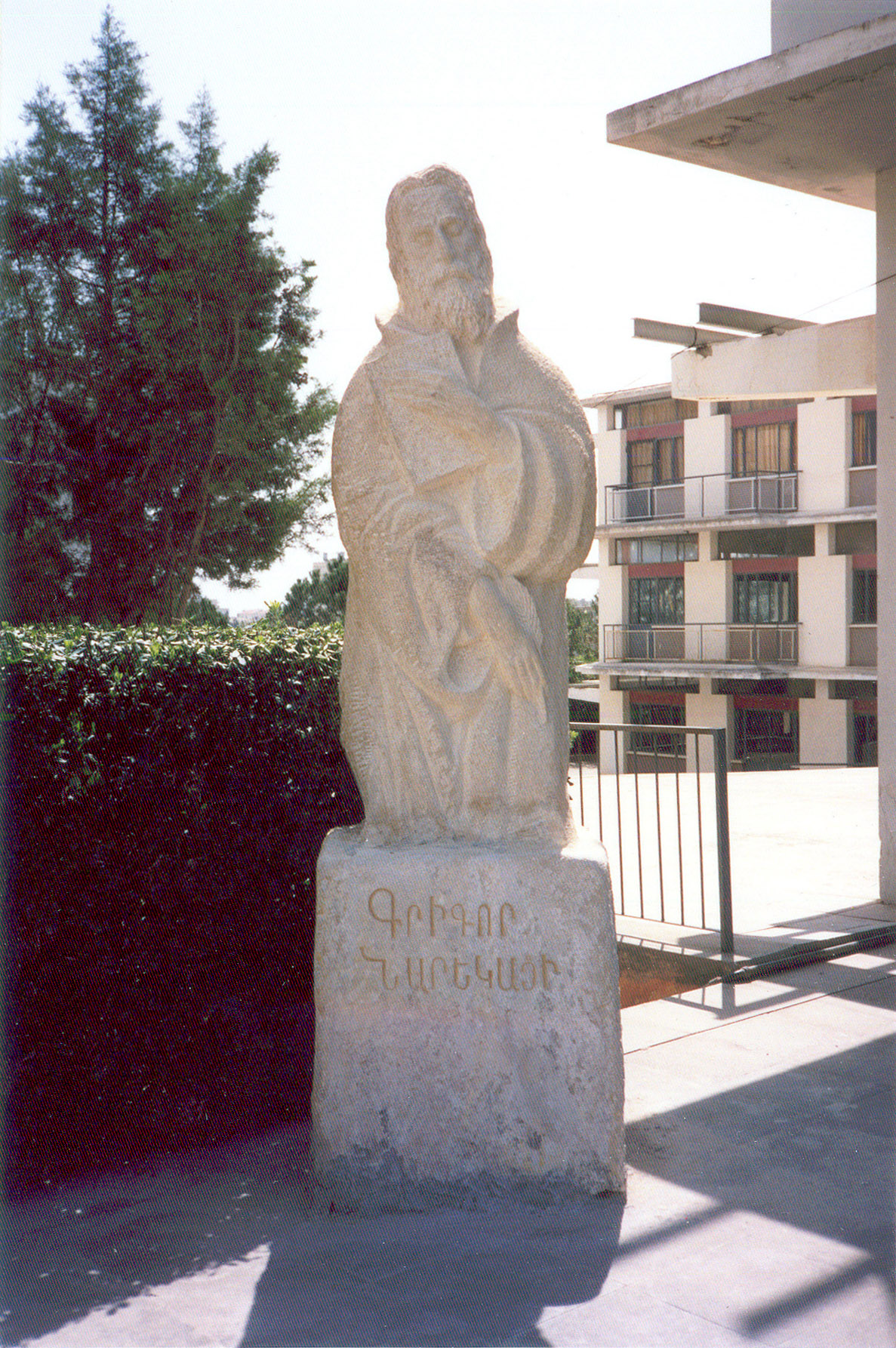
The statue of Krikor Naregatsi in front of Nareg School in Nicosia

Education is a very important part of the Armenian community of Cyprus. It first appeared in the second half of the 19th century, within the framework of the Tanzimat reformations. The first Armenian school in Cyprus, established by newly arrived Archimandrite Vartan Mamigonian, opened its doors in Nicosia in 1870; it was followed by an Armenian school in Larnaca (1909), Famagusta (1927) and Limassol (1928). Small Armenian schools, some public and others private, used to operate also at the Magaravank (1897–1914), the Attalou settlement near Kharcha (1910–1922), Amiandos (1928–1939 & 1942–1948), Mavrovouni (1939-1942), Nicosia (1900-1905) and Larnaca 1896-1899, 1916-1918, 1921-1936, as well as in various villages during the World War II evacuation. Of the private Armenian schools of the island, it is worth mentioning the short-lived but significant National Educational Orphanage (Ազգային Կրթարան-Որբանոց, 1897–1904), established in Nicosia by Vahan M. Kurkjian (Pagouran), and naturally the world-renowned Melkonian Educational Institute (Մելգոնեան Կրթական Հաստատութիւն, 1926–2005), established in Nicosia by brothers Krikor and Garabed Melkonian and administered by the Armenian General Benevolent Union.

In 1972, all four Armenian Elementary Schools in Cyprus were called Nareg National Schools (Նարեկ Ազգային Վարժարաններ), in memory of great Armenian monk, poet, mystical philosopher and theologian Saint Gregory of Nareg (951–1003), whose sandstone statue was sculpted in 1991 by the famous Armenian sculptor Levon Tokmadjian and placed in front of the Nicosia Nareg; it was unveiled by Representative Aram Kalaydjian on 24 March 1991. Also in 1991, all the three Armenian Elementary Schools assumed their current name: Nareg Armenian Schools (Նարեկ Հայկական Վարժարաններ). Currently, there is one Nareg school in Nicosia, one in Larnaca and one in Limassol. In Nicosia, Nareg also operates as a Gymnasium (Junior High School), as of September 2005, due to the unfair closure of the Melkonian Educational Institute. Currently, the Gymnasium section has about 10 students.

As of 1960, the annual budget of the schools is fully covered by the Ministry of Education and Culture and education is provided for free; previously, the budget was covered partly by the Armenian Prelature of Cyprus (mainly out of the exploitation of the Magaravank's carob and oil trees’ production) and partly by tuition fees. The schools are open to all children of Armenian descent. The teaching and administrative staff is appointed and paid by the School Committee, with the exception of the Greek language and history teachers, who are provided by the Ministry of Education and Culture and paid by the Educational Service Commission. In 1998 the government approved the pension scheme for the staff of Nareg Schools, with the same terms and conditions that their Greek-Cypriot colleagues benefit.

Currently, Armenian schools in Cyprus have about 205 students (Nicosia: 135, Larnaca: 30, Limassol: 40). Their administering body is the 11-member Armenian Schools’ Committee (Կիպրահայ Վարժարաններու Հոգաբարձութիւն), which - according to Law 103(I)/1999 - has a 5-year tenure and it is appointed by the Council of Ministers after the suggestion of the Minister of Education and Culture, who consults with the Armenian Representative; as of November 2009, the 11–member Schools' Committee is headed by Vartan Tashdjian. The current School Committee was appointed by the Decision of the Council of Ministers 69.557/18–11–2009, while the Decision of the Council of Ministers 70.780/14–07–2010 replaced a member who had resigned. Other than Mr Tashdjian, currently the School Committee consists of the following members: Sebouh Tavitian, Masis der Parthogh, Avedis Chouldjian, Yeran Kouyoumdjian, Assadour Devledian, Raffi Mahdessian, Nayiri (der Arakelian) Merheje, Rita Kasparian, Dr. Missag Keshishian and Haroutiun Kassabian.

Initially, the School Committee was appointed by the Armenian Ethnarchy of Cyprus until 1921, when its members were then appointed by the High Commissioner/Governor (Colonial Law XXIV/1920); between 1960–1965 it was appointed by the Greek Communal Chamber, while since 1966 it has been appointed by the Council of Ministers. In 1961, the individual public Armenian schools in Cyprus were placed under the directorship of a single Headmaster in Nicosia, with the assistance of a senior teacher in Larnaca and a senior teacher in Limassol; the Famagusta Armenian School had only one teacher. As of September 2009, the schools' Headmistress is Vera Tahmazian.

Over time, the academic curricula of these schools have kept pace with the needs and challenges of the community’s fluctuating population and the government’s requirements. Currently, the education they provide is tri-lingual (Armenian, Greek, English) and their curriculum is equivalent to that of the public schools, enhanced with lessons of Armenian language, history and geography, as well as activities that cultivate Armenianism, Armenology and the Armenian culture. One cannot overlook the fact that all Armenian schools in Cyprus are adjacent to the local churches, with the active participation of Church leaders, a vivid proof of the traditional school-church bond that has existed for centuries in Armenian reality.

Below is a list of the Headmasters for the National/Armenian Schools in Cyprus, from 1921 until today (there is no complete information before 1921):

Headmaster	Term	Jurisdiction
Archbishop Bedros Saradjian	1921–1933	Cyprus
Setrak Guebenlian	1933–1949	Nicosia, Limassol, Famagusta
Haigazoun Hagopian	1933–1937	Larnaca
Assadour Magarian	1937–1945	Larnaca
Sarkis Avedissian	1945–1961	Larnaca
Garbis Yessayian	1949–1961	Nicosia, Limassol, Famagusta
Garbis Yessayian	1961–1964	Cyprus
Haroutiun Essegulian	1964–1972	Cyprus
Haroutiun Manougian	1972–1973	Cyprus
Sarkis Avedissian	1973–1975	Cyprus
Vartan Tashdjian	1975–2001	Cyprus
Artin Aivazian	2001–2009	Cyprus
Vera Tahmazian	2009–	Cyprus

== Melkonian ==
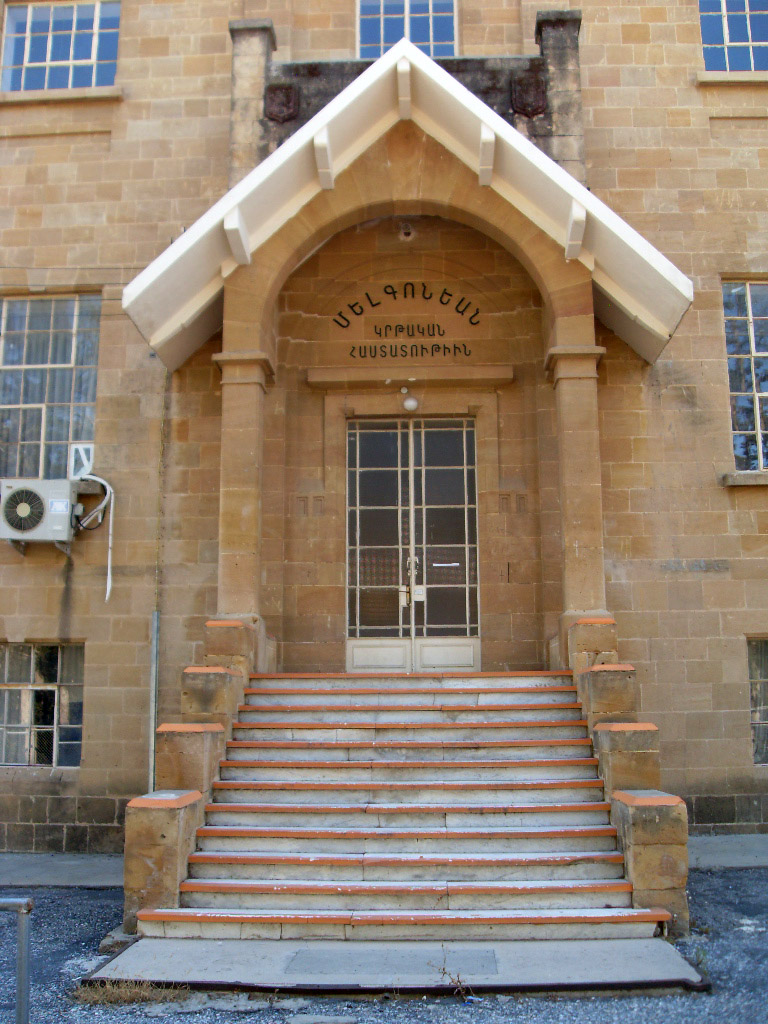
One of Melkonian's entrances

The renowned Melkonian Educational Institute (Մելգոնեան Կրթական Միութիւն) was built off Limassol Avenue in Aglandjia after the generous and benevolent donation of tobacco-trading brothers Krikor and Garabed Melkonian, who were not left apathetic by the horrific Armenian genocide. Adana Prelate, Bishop Moushegh Seropian, had encouraged the Melkonian brothers [commonly referred to as parerarner (բարերարներ=benefactors)] to undertake such a project, in order to give shelter and education to about 500 Armenian orphans of the Armenian genocide who had fled to Syria, Lebanon and Mesopotamia. According to tradition, the location, at the time 3 km outside Nicosia, is said to have been chosen in 1923 by Garabed Melkonian himself, because no minarets could be seen from there. Its foundation stone was laid on 15 February 1924 by High Commissioner Sir Malcolm Stevenson and it was inaugurated on 13 February 1926 by Archbishop Zaven der Yeghiayian. The grove in front of the school was planted by the first orphans, in memory of their relatives who perished during the Armenian genocide. The Melkonian evolved from an orphanage (1926–1940) to a renowned secondary school (1934–2005). A unique and unparalleled achievement, it was a beacon of hope and culture for Armenianism and Armenophony across the world, boasting an international membership of Armenian students from over 30 countries. From 1930 until its unjust closure in 2005, 1.828 students graduated from here. Rightly, it was called an ambassador of Cyprus to all over the world. It had a boarding section, a rich library and well-equipped laboratories.

On top of the entrances of the twin school buildings, there was the following inscription in Armenian:

ՄԵԼԳՈՆԵԱՆ ԿՐԹԱԿԱՆ ՀԱՍՏԱՏՈՒԹԻՒՆ (Melkonian Educational Institute)

Above each entrance canopy there were two reddish-brown crests containing the date that each building's construction started and ended. They read as following:

1924 Փետր. 15 (15 February 1924) (left side, boys' building)

1925 Նոյ. 21 (21 November 1925) (right side, boys' building)

1924 Դեկտ. 12 (12 December 1924) (left side, girls' building)

1925 Դեկտ. 24 (24 December 1925) (right side, girls' building)

Garabed Melkonian assigned the administration of the school to the AGBU on 28 December 1925. Upon becoming a secondary school, the Melkonian Educational Institute offered various branches of education. Between 1935–1967 there was a pedagogigal/teachers' section, between 1936–1942 there was a technical school (according to the reports of the Director of the Department of Education, the first true technical school of the island), between 1937–1964 and 1974–2005 there was a commercial section, between 1950–2005 there was a science section, between 1964–1973 there was a general education section, while between 1966–1975 there was a social sciences section. Other than English, French and Armenian (both Western Armenian and Classical Armenian), at times and depending on the countries of origin of the student population, the students were also taught Greek, Arabic, Persian, Bulgarian and Russian.

Also known as "an island within an island", it had a great educational and cultural impact on the Armenian-Cypriot community. It had a theatre group, a dance group, a choir, a band, a football team, a basketball team, a boys' volleyball team and a girls' volleyball team, as well as the historical 7th Cyprus Scout Group (1932–2006) and the 9th Cyprus Guide Team (1950–2005). The Melkonian Educational Institute published the famous Ayk magazine [Այգ (Dawn), 1937–1940, 1948–1956, 1959–1964, 1970–1976, 1978–1982, 1993–2006], the oldest Armenian secondary school magazine, as well as the Tsolk newspaper [Ցոլք (Gleam), 1968–1991] and Hayatsk newspaper [Հայեացք (Glance), 1998–2000], which later on became the Hayatsk magazine (2000–2004).

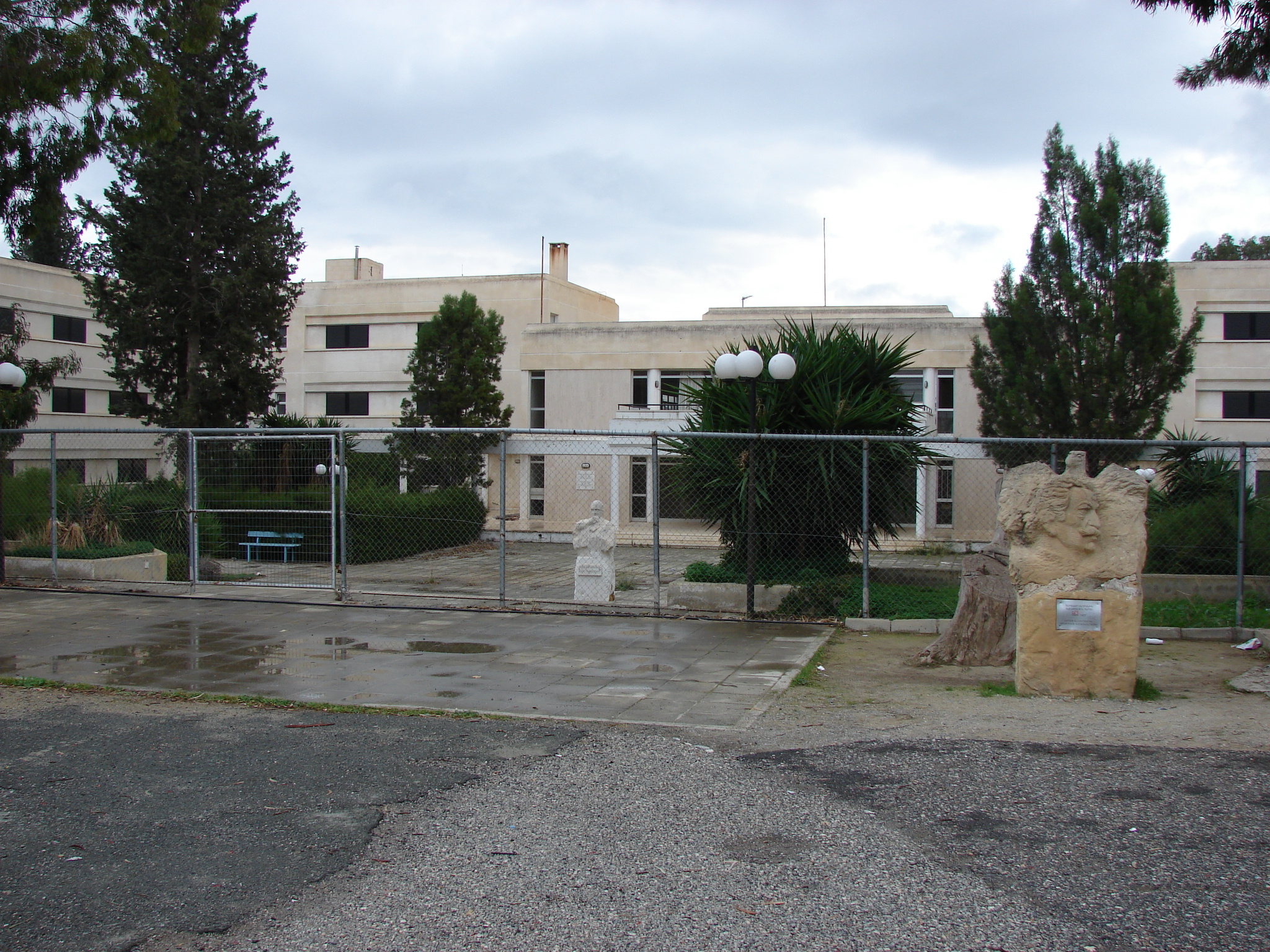
The new boarding section of Melkonian

The Melkonian Educational Institute had been the largest and longest-living Western Armenian boarding school. The new boarding section was built between 1987–1989 by architects Iacovos & Andreas Philippou to the east of the twin buildings; its foundation stone was laid on 24 May 1987 by President Spyros Kyprianou, while its inauguration took place on 21 October 1989 by Acting President Vassos Lyssarides. To the left of the new boarding sections' entrance, there is a marble commemorative plaque in reading:

Κατάθεση θεμέλιου λίθου 24 του Μάη 1987 Πρόεδρος της Κύπρου κ. Σπύρος Κυπριανού - Foundation stone 24th May 1987 The President of Cyprus Mr Spyros Kyprianou

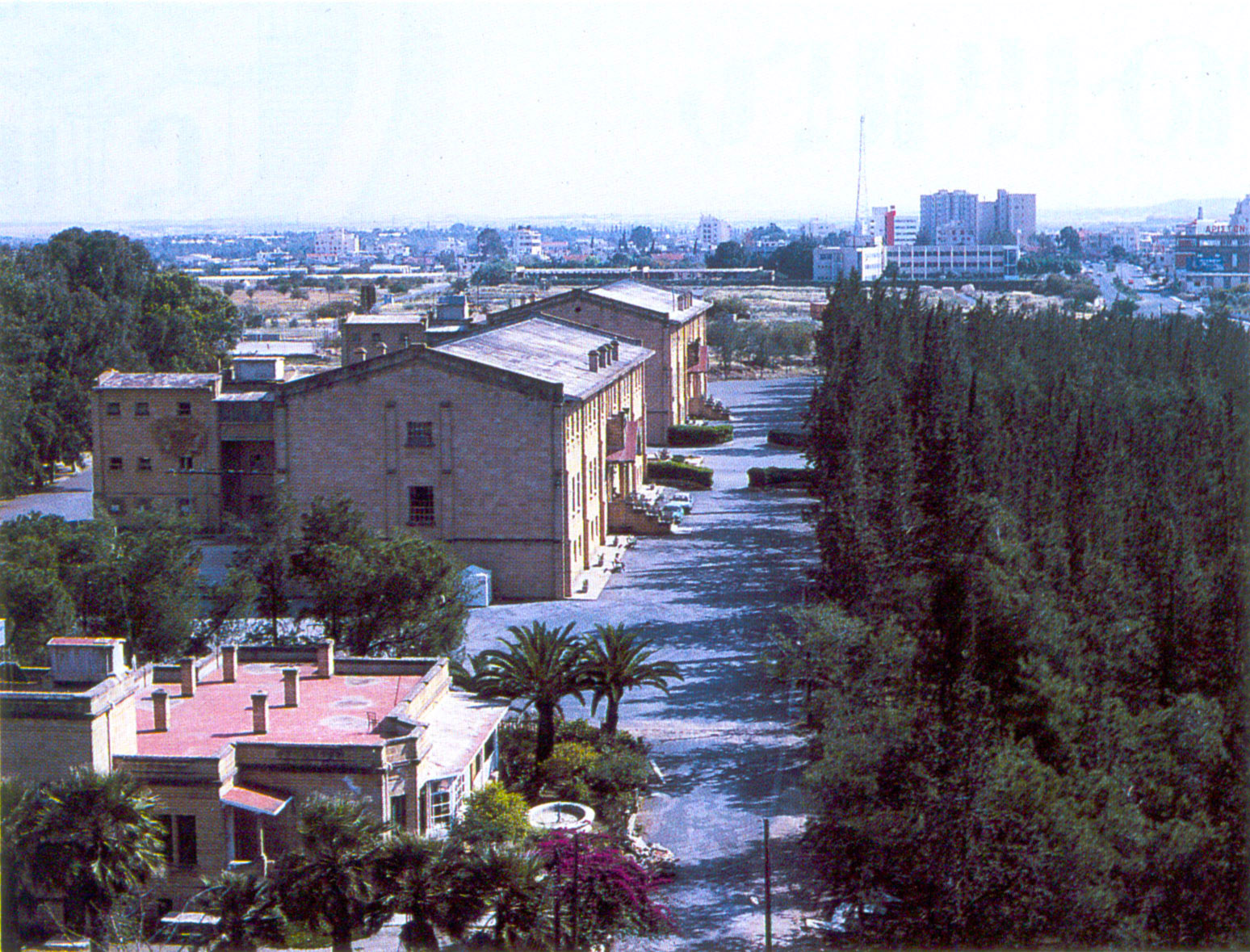
Panoramic view of the Melkonian (1986)

The school was administered by the New York-based AGBU, according to the contract signed by the benefactor Garabed Melkonian on 28 December 1925. Unfortunately, it was closed down in 2005 because of AGBU's greed masked behind the façade that the school was no longer operating efficiently. Although the litigation was won by AGBU's legal team, there is a permanent ministerial decree (02/03/2007) that characterises 60% of its total area as being of "special architectural, historical and social character and natural beauty".

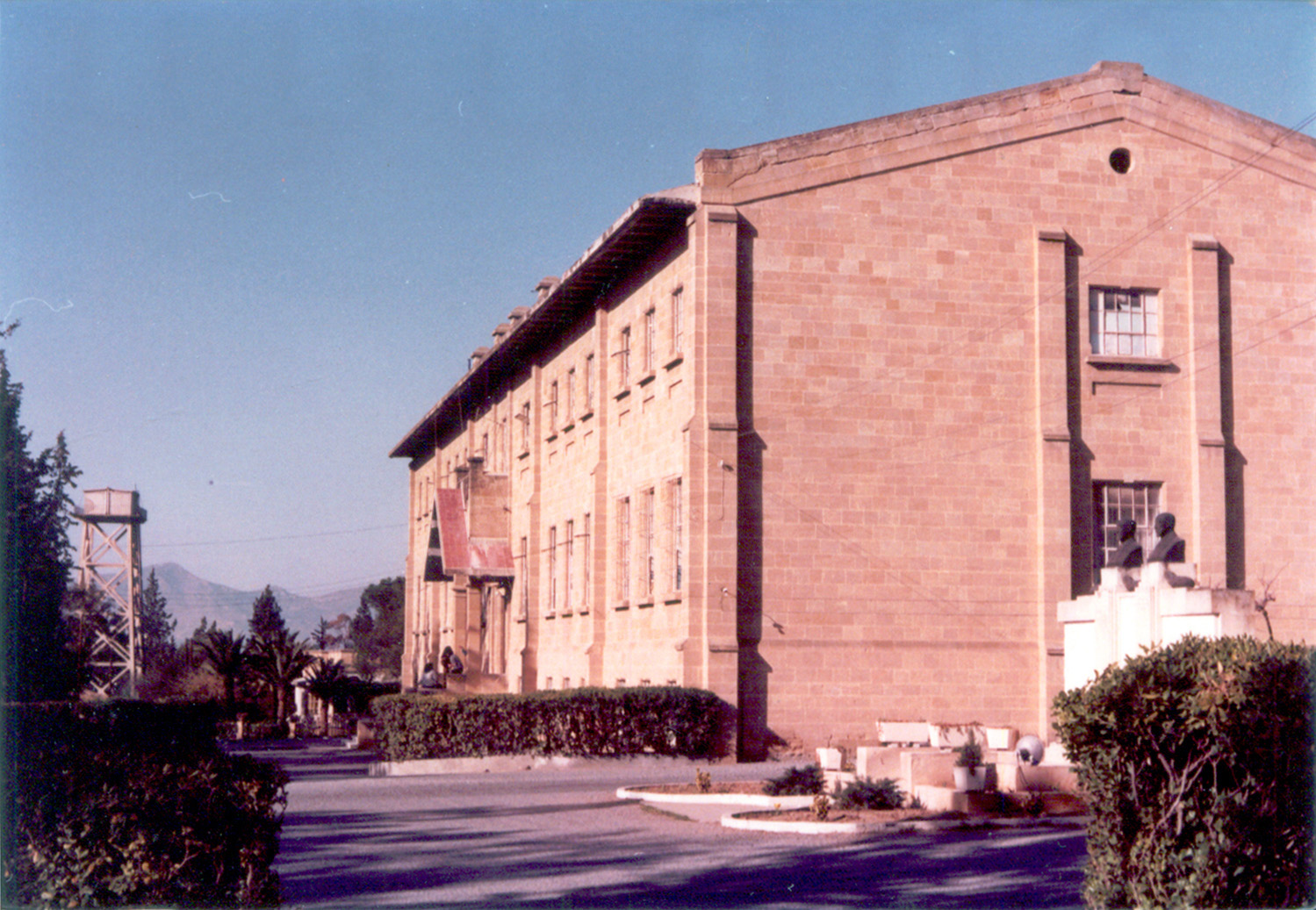
View of the Melkonian with the watertower at the back

Between the two historical buildings of the Melkonian Educational Institute, there is the white marble Mausoleum of the immortal benefactors, Krikor Melkonian and Garabed Melkonian; its foundation stone was laid on 24 April 1954 by Bishop Ghevont Chebeyan, who unveiled it on 15 January 1956. On the buildings' sides facing the Benefactors' Mausoleum are the twin sandstone monuments for the Armenian Alphabet and Mother Armenia; they were unveiled by AGBU President Alec Manougian. Between the old and the new buildings, there is a series of sandstone statues depicting important pillars of Armenian history and letters: (great Armenian marine painter Hovhannes Aivazovsky, first Armenian printer Hagop Meghabard, great Armenian musician, composer and conductor Gomidas Vartabed Soghomonian, inventor of the Armenian alphabet Saint Mesrob Mashdots, Armenian national hero, freedom fighter and military commander General Antranik Ozanian, great Armenian poet and Melkonian teacher Vahan Tekeyan and great Armenian historian of the "Golden Century" Movses Khorenatsi), all placed between 1990–1991. Finally, in front of the new boarding section there is the white marble bust of then AGBU President Alec Manougian, placed there in 1990; the sandstone statues and the marble bust are the work of Armenian sculptor Levon Tokmadjian, who chiselled them on site, at the request of Headmaster Vahe Gabouchian.

Originally, the Melkonian Educational Institute was administered only by the Headmaster. As of 1940, it was supervised by the Melkonian Educational Institute School Committee (Մելգոնեան Կրթական Հաստատութեան Հոգաբարձութիւն), appointed by the AGBU Central Board; usually, the school committee had 5 members. Below is a list of Headmasters and Headmistresses of the Institute:

Headmaster	Term	Headmaster	Term	Headmaster	Term
Archbishop Zaven Der Yeghiayian	1926–1927	Haroutiun Ayvazian	1959–1960	Artin Aivazian	1988–1990
Krikor Giragossian	1927–1936	Dr. Khacher Kalousdian	1960–1964	Dr. Vahe Gabouchian	1990–1992
Dr. Hagop Topdjian	1936–1945	Assadour Bedian	1964–1976	Antranik Dakessian	1992–1993
Taniel Vosgian	1945–1956	Sosse Boyadjian-Bedigian	1976–1985	Hagop Kasbarian	1993–1996
Puzant Yeghiayian	1956–1959	Dr. Akabi Nassibian-Ekmekdjian	1985–1988	Ani Lachinian-Magarian	1996–2005

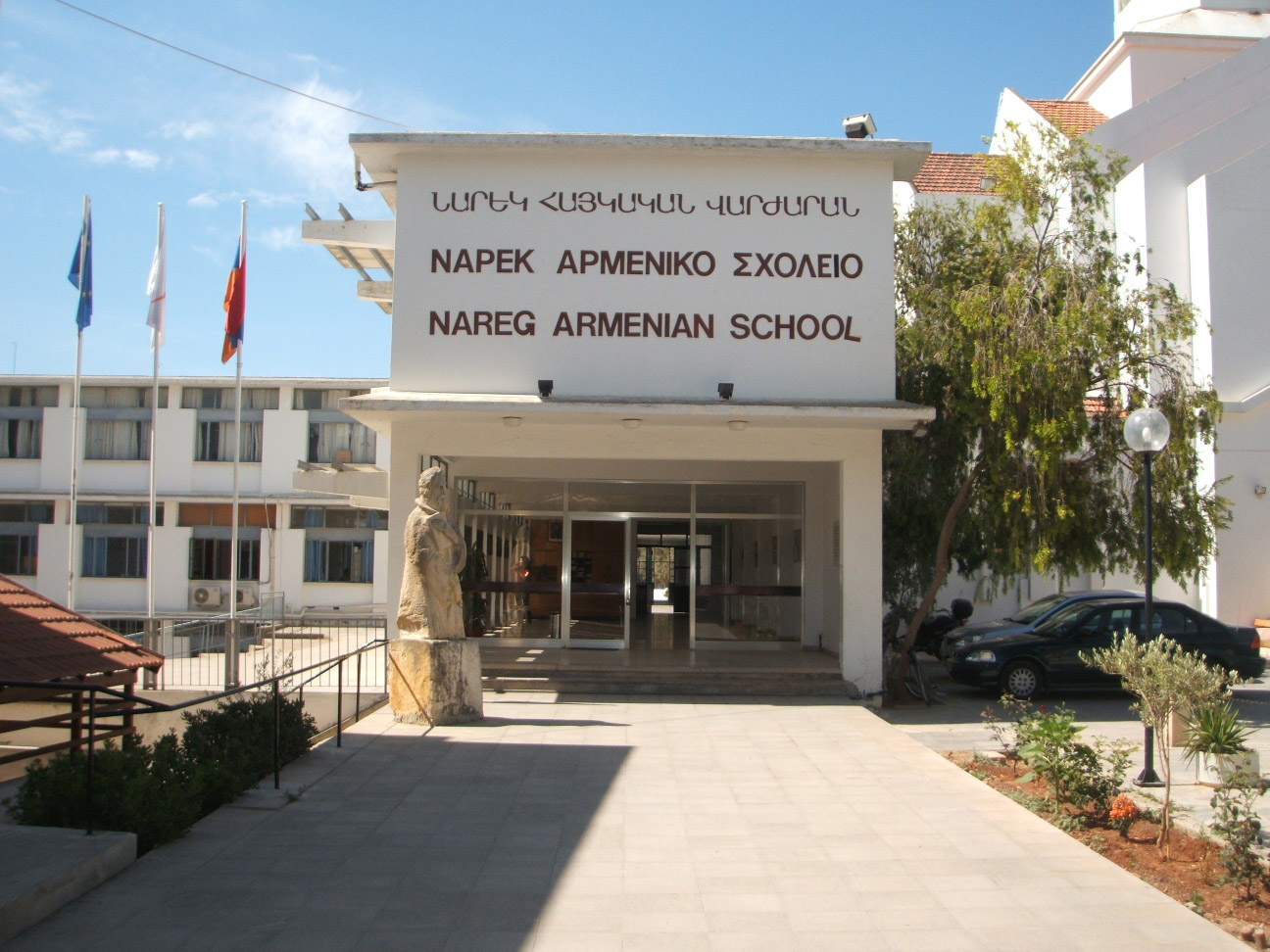
Nareg Armenian school in Nicosia

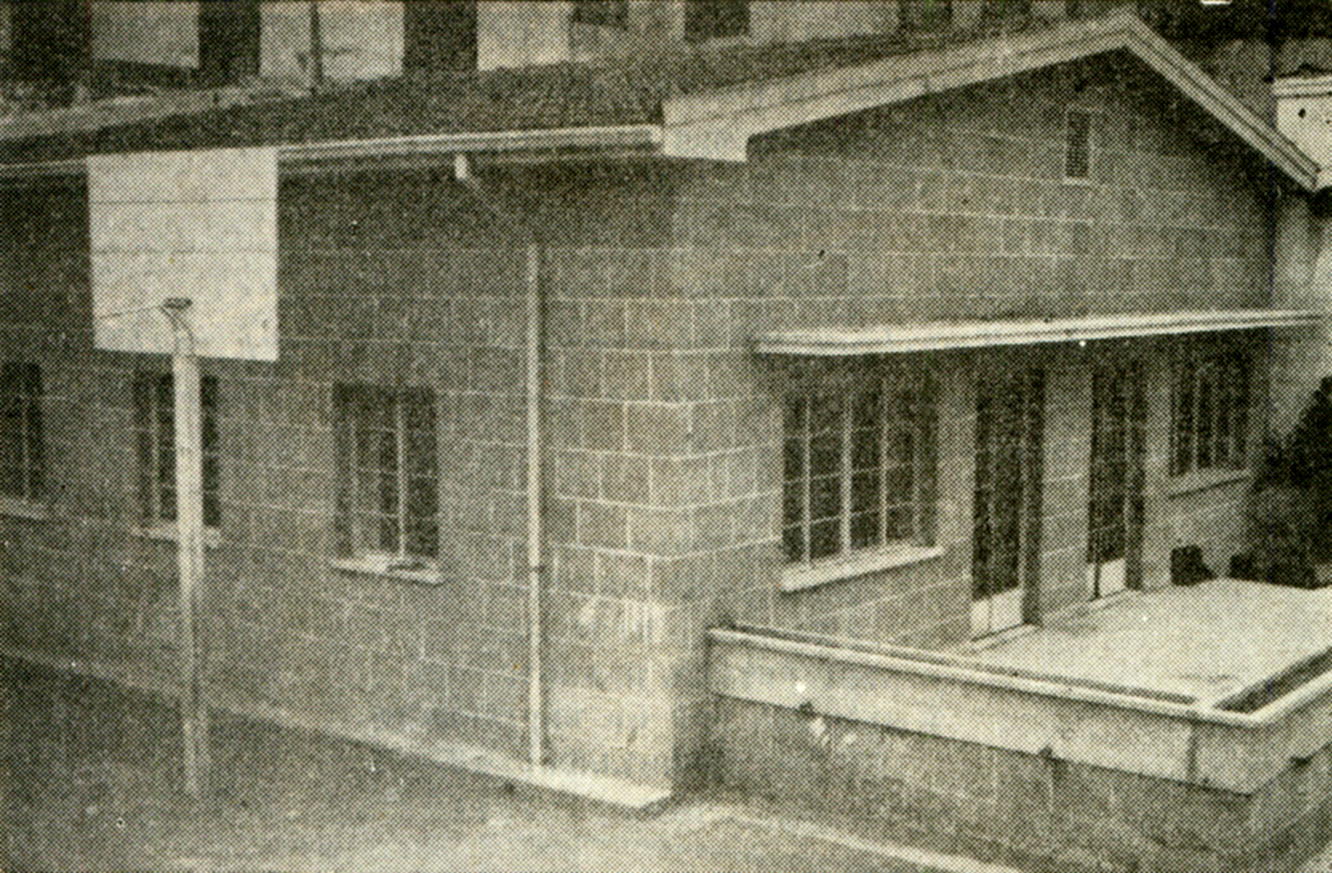
The old kindergarten building in Nicosia

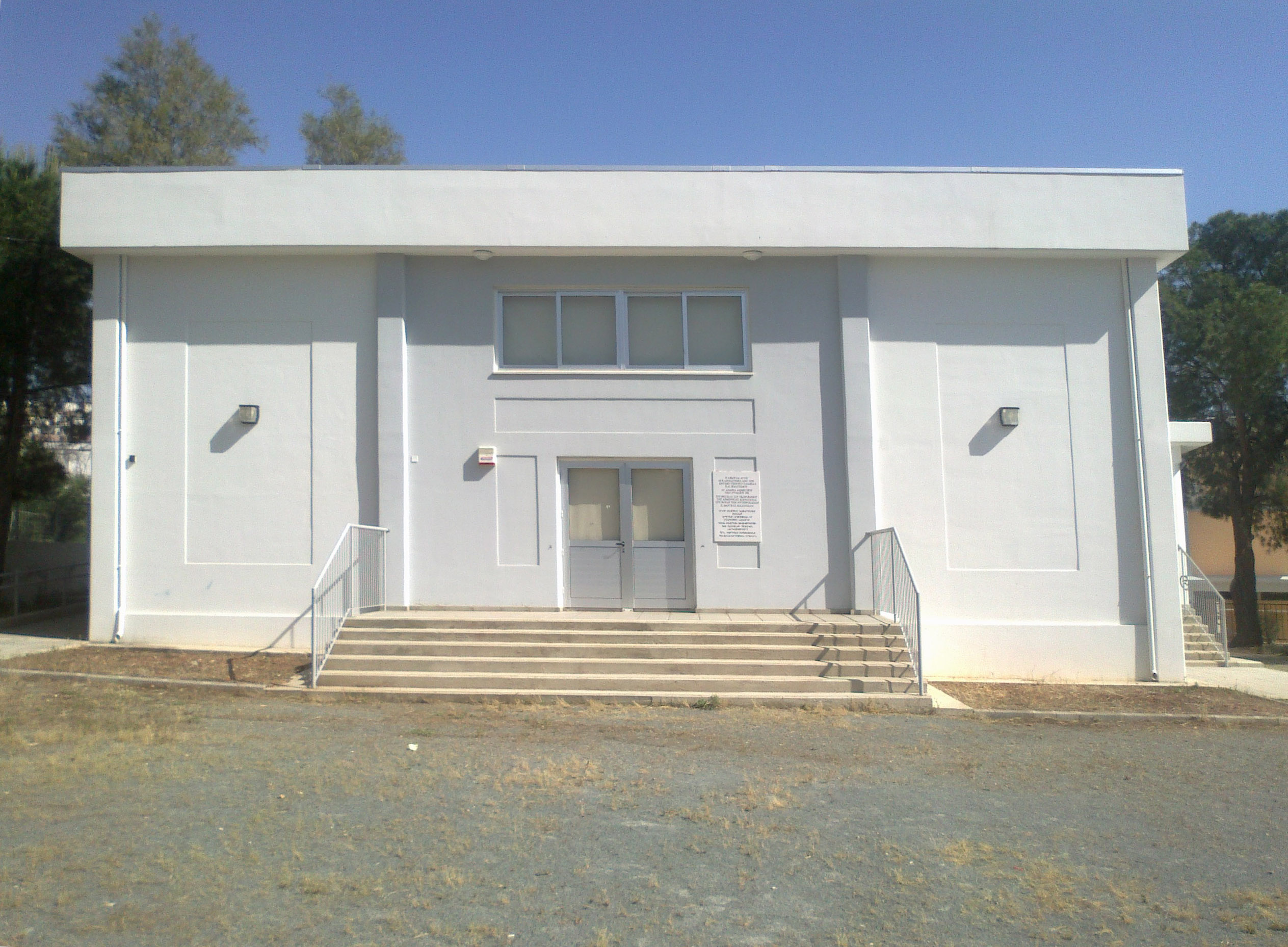
Nicosia Nareg school's auditorium

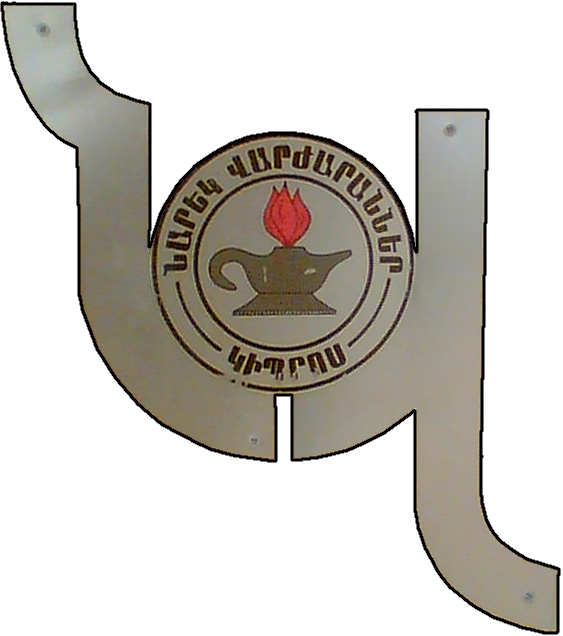
Nareg Armenian Schools' logo

== Locations ==
=== Nicosia ===
Nicosia's first Armenian school was established in 1870 by newly arrived Archimandrite Vartan Mamigonian: the National Armenian School (Հայ Ազգային Վարժարան) was housed in a small building in the courtyard of the Armenian church in Victoria street. In 1886 it was repaired by locum tenens priest Hovhannes Shahinian, who called it Vartanants Boys' School (Վարդանանց Մանչերու Վարժարան), while in 1902 Archimandrite Bedros Saradjian founded the Shoushanian Girls' School (Շուշանեան Աղջկանց Վարժարան), at which a kindergarten started operating in 1907.

In 1921, by the will and testament of wealthy local landowner Artin Bey Melikian (1858–1921), the Melikian National School (Մելիքեան Ազգային Վարժարան) was founded, thus replacing the previous two schools with a co-educational one; it was initially considered too big, but only a year later it was full of Armenian children of the genocide. In 1938 the Ouzounian National School (Ուզունեան Ազգային Վարժարան) was added to it, after the donation of successful businessman Dickran Ouzounian (1870–1957); subsequently, the school operated under the name Melikian-Ouzounian National School (Մելիգեան-Ուզունեան Ազգային Վարժարան). In 1950 a new building was built for the kindergarten using proceeds from school functions.

On top of the entrance of the Melikian National School there was the following marble commemorative inscription:

Մելիքեան Վարժարան շինեալ արդեամբք ժառանգորդաց Արթին Պէյ Մելիքեանի 1921 (Melikian School built by commission of Artin Bey Melikian's heirs 1921)

On top of the entrance of the Ouzounian National School there was the following marble commemorative inscription:

Ուզունեան Վարժարան շինեալ արդեամբ Տիար Տիգրան Ուզունեանի ի յիշատակ իւր եւ իւր տիկնոջ Թ. Ուզունեանի 1938 (Ouzounian school built by commission of Mr Dickran Ouzounian in memory of him and his wife Touma Ouzounian 1938)

As the entire Armenian quarter of Nicosia was taken over by Turkish Cypriots during the Cyprus crisis of 1963–64, the educational work suffered a temporary halt. Despite the uncertain political situation in the island, between February and July 1964 the school was housed at the Mitsis’ School for Girls in Archbishop Makarios III Avenue. Thanks to arrangements made by Representative Berge Tilbian and with full government aid, between September 1964 and July 1972 school life was re-organised in two pre-fabricated buildings on the grounds of the Melkonian Educational Institute under the name Armenian National School (Հայ Ազգային Վարժարան).

With the community feeling the need for a permanent school, government land was granted on 16 December 1966 in trust, thanks to appeals by Representative Berge Tilbian. The purposely-built three-storey school building with its open amphitheatre was eventually erected between 1971–1972, thanks to the efforts of Representative Dr. Antranik L. Ashdjian, by the Technical Services of the Ministry of Education, with Pefkios Georghiades as its architect. The school premises were inaugurated on 12 November 1972 by Archbishop Makarios III and Catholicos Khoren I, thus opening a bright new page in the educational and cultural life of the community.

Just before the entrance of the school, there is a marble commemorative plaque in Greek reading:

"Το Δημοτικόν Σχολείον Ναρέκ εκτίσθη επί χώρου δωρηθέντος υπό της κυπριακής κυβερνήσεως και ενεκαινιάσθη υπό της Α. Μ. του Προέδρου της Κυπριακής Δημοκρατίας Αρχιεπισκόπου Μακαρίου Γ' την 12ην Νοεμβρίου 1972 παρουσία του Καθόλικου Χορέν Α' της Κιλικίας. Η ανέγερσις του σχολείου έγινε με την φροντίδα του Αντιπροσώπου της αρμενικής κοινότητος εις την Βουλήν Δρος Αντρανίκ Αστζιάν" (The Nareg Elementary School was built on ground donated by the government of Cyprus and was inaugurated by H. B. the President of the Republic of Cyprus Archbishop Makarios III on the 12th November 1972 in the presence of Catholicos Khoren I of Cilicia. The erection of the school was made under the care of the Representative of the Armenian community in the House Dr Antranik Ashdjian)

In the past, the school had a band and a scout group. It is worth mentioning that on 10 December 1979 Strovolos Improvement Board decided to rename the road in front of the school from "Cyclops street" to "Armenia street", as a gesture of solidarity to the brotherly Armenian people. This decision was taken after the suggestion of Bishop Zareh Aznavorian and community members. Also, thanks to the efforts of Representative Aram Kalaydjian, a freehold title deed on the land was given on 31 March 1983 in the name of the Virgin Mary church.

In front of the school's entrance is the sandstone statue of Saint Gregory of Nareg, the work of Armenian sculptor Levon Tokmadjian; it was unveiled by Representative Aram Kalaydjian on 24 March 1991. Under the statue the following inscription is inscribed in Armenian:

Գրիգոր Նարեկացի Gregory of Nareg

In September 2005, following the unfair closure of the Melkonian Educational Institute, Nareg Nicosia started operating a Gymnasium section, fully funded and staffed by the Ministry of Education and Culture. Between 2008–2010, a new auditorium was built by the Technical Services of the Ministry of Education and Culture, with Joanna Christou as its architect. The new auditorium was inaugurated on 17 May 2011 by Minister of Education and Culture, Dr. Andreas Demetriou. On the side of the entrance, there is a marble commemorative plaque in Greek and Armenian reading:

Η αίθουσα αυτή εγκαινιάσθηκε από τον έντιμο Υπουργό Παιδείας και Πολιτισμού Δρ. Ανδρέα Δημητρίου την 17η Μαΐου 2011 επί θητείας του Εκπροσώπου της αρμενικής κοινότητας στη Βουλή των Αντιπροσώπων κ. Βαρτκές Μαχτεσιάν - Սրահի բացումը կատարուեցաւ ձեռամբ Կիպրոսի Կրթութեան եւ Մշակոյթի Նախարար Դոկտ. Անտրէաս Տիմիթրիույի Հայ համայնքի Պետական Ներկայացուցիչ Պրն. Վարդգէս Մահտեսեանի պաշտօնավարութեան շրջանին (This hall was inaugurated by the honourable Minister of Education and Culture Dr. Andreas Demetriou on the 17th May 2011 during the term of the Representative of the Armenian community in the House of Representatives Mr Vartkes Mahdessian)

Finally, in 2010 the school was completely renovated, thanks to the initiative of the current School Committee. Currently, the school has about 135 students.

=== Larnaca ===
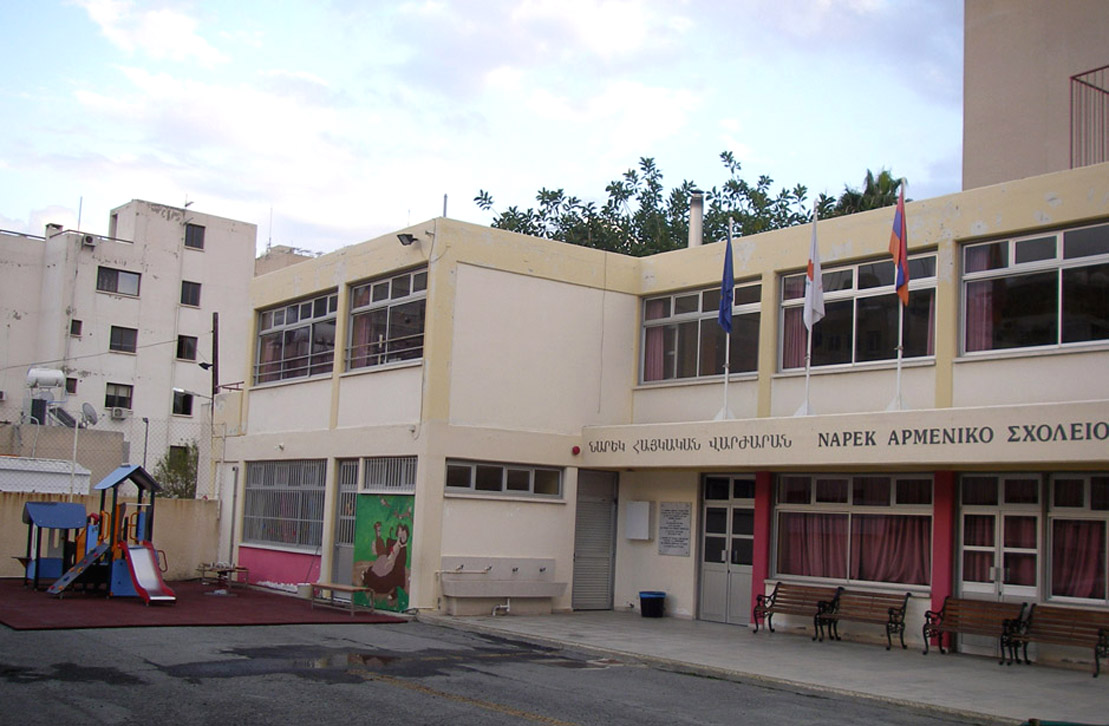
Nareg Armenian school in Larnaca

With the arrival of a number of Armenian refugees who escaped the Adana massacre (1909), the local parish council established a small school under Miss Rebecca Gomidassian. The school was soon visited by Adana Bishop, Moushegh Seropian, who secured part of the necessary funding from the AGBU for a permanent school: thus, the Mousheghian National School (Մուշեղեան Ազգային Վարժարան) was erected next to Saint Stephen’s church. In 1917 a second room was added, by donation of Miss Hanemie Eramian.

With the influx of a large number of Armenian genocide refugees (1915–1923), the school was considered insufficient for the local needs. Thus, with financial support from the Adana Educational Association of Watertown, Massachusetts, a larger school building was constructed in 1923 and called National Armenian School (Հայ Ազգային Վարժարան); a second floor was added in 1926, by donation of the late Garabed Melkonian. In the early 1940s, Larnaca Municipality decided to rename the road in front of the school from "Hadjistavrou street" to "Armenian Church street". Also, in the past the school had a scout group.

On top of the entrance, there used to be a marble commemorative plaque in Armenian reading:

ՀԱՅ ԱԶԳ. ՎԱՐԺԱՐԱՆ Հիմնուած 1923 օժանդակութեամբ Ատանայի Հայ Ուսումն. Միութեան - Ուօթրթաուն, Մէսս (NATIONAL ARMENIAN SCHOOL Built in 1923 with the succour of Adana's Armenian Educational Association - Watertown, Massacchussetts)

On the right-hand side of the entrance door, there used to be another marble commemorative plaque in Armenian reading:

Ի'հիմանց կառուցաւ խուցս ծախիւք Օր. Հանըմի Պ. Երամեան յ'ամի 1917 (This room was constructed from its foundations with expenses of Miss Hanemie B. Eramian in the year 1917)

The school’s playground temporarily hosted many Lebanese-Armenian refugees during the Lebanese civil war (1975–1990). However, over time and after an earthquake in 1991, the school building exhibited structural weaknesses, raising serious concerns. Thanks to the efforts of Representative Aram Kalaydjian, the Technical Services of the Ministry of Education and Culture built a new two-storey school building between 1993–1995, in what used to be the school yard, with Androulla Demetriou as its architect. The new school was inaugurated on 18 May 1996 by President Glafcos Clerides. The old school was used as a store room until it was demolished in November 2007.

On the left-hand side of the entrance door, there is a marble commemorative plaque in Greek reading:

Το Αρμενικό Δημοτικό Σχολείο Ναρέκ κτίστηκε από την κυπριακή κυβέρνηση σε χώρο που δωρήθηκε από την Αρμενική Εκκλησία και εγκαινιάστηκε από την Αυτού Εξοχότητα τον Πρόεδρο της Κυπριακής Δημοκρατίας κ. Γλαύκο Κληρίδη στις 18 Μαΐου 1996 - Η ανέγερση του σχολείου έγινε με φροντίδα του Αντιπροσώπου της Αρμενικής Κοινότητας στη Βουλή κ. Αράμ Καλαϊτζιάν (The Nareg Armenian Elementary School was built by the government of Cyprus on a ground donated by the Armenian Church and was inaugurated by His Excellency the President of the Republic of Cyprus Mr Glafcos Clerides on 18 May 1996 - The construction of the school was made with the care of the Representative of the Armenian Community in the House Mr Aram Kalaydjian)

Finally, in 2012 the school was partially renovated, thanks to the initiative of the current School Committee. Currently, it has about 30 students.

=== Limassol ===
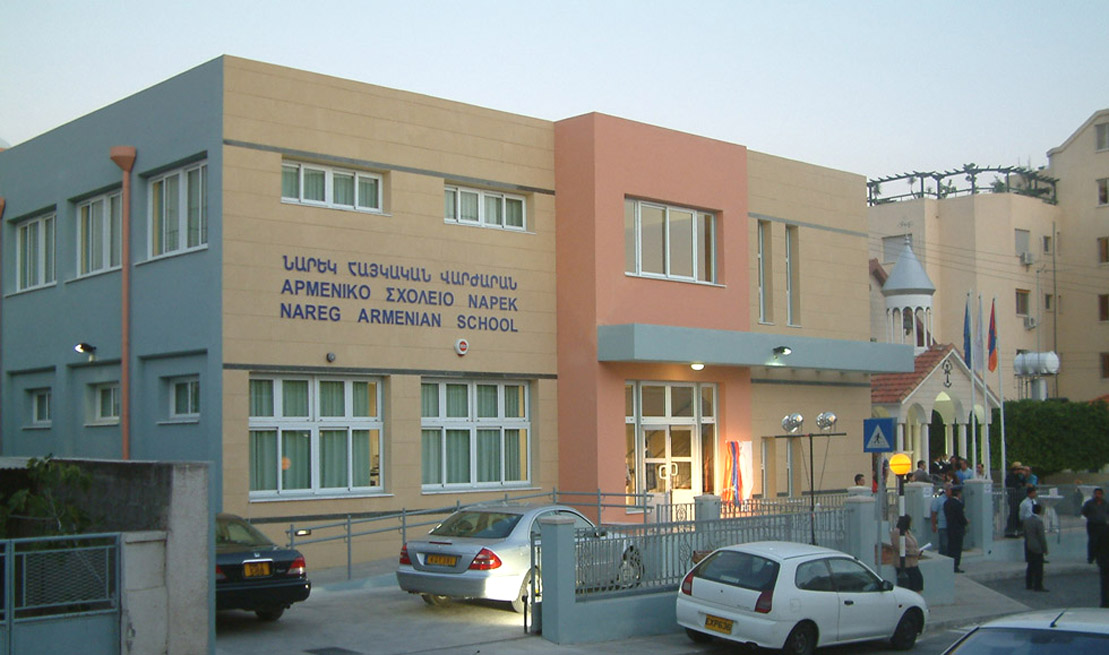
Nareg Armenian school in Limassol

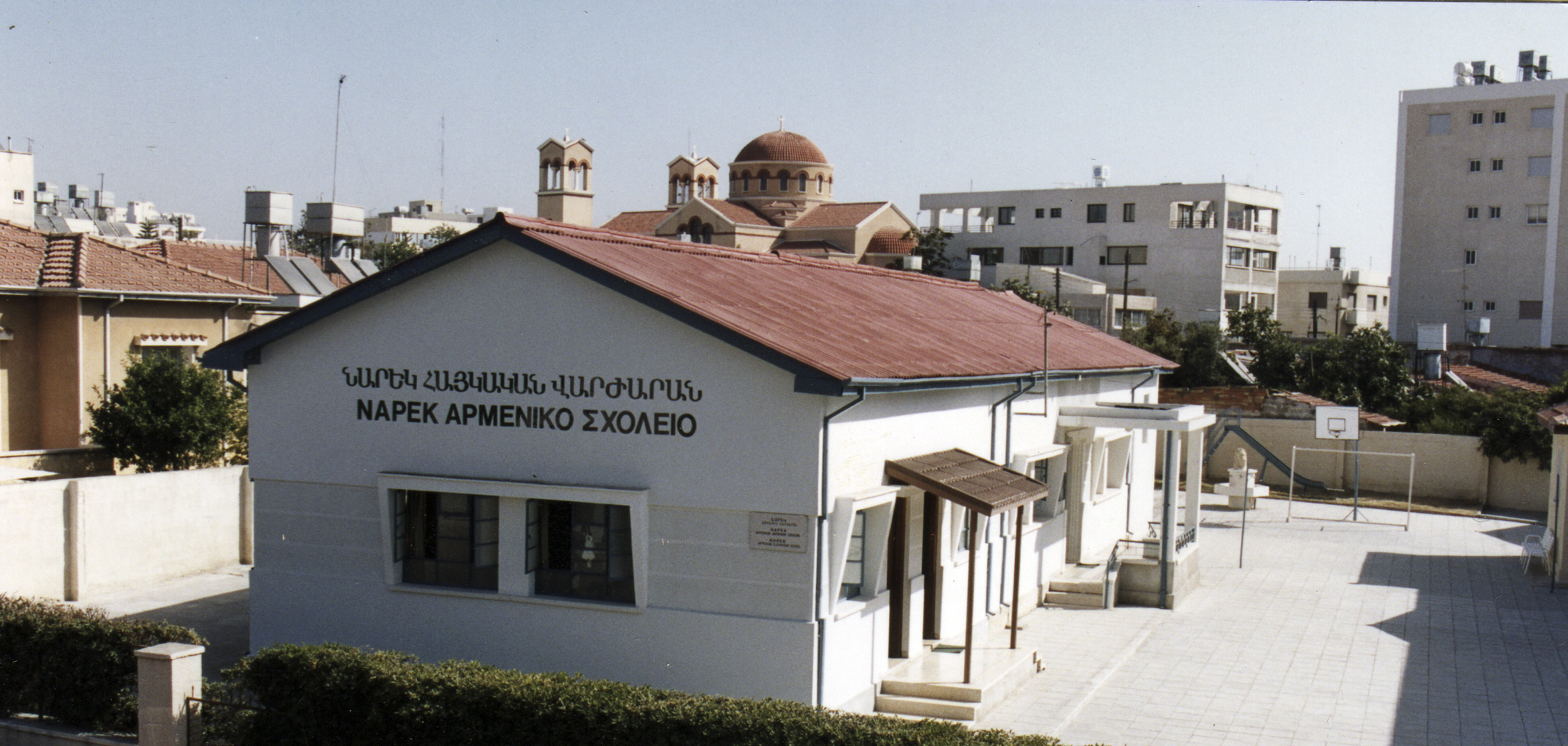
The old Nareg Armenian school in Limassol

The first Armenian school in Limassol was established in 1928, by initiative of Archbishop Bedros Saradjian, at the house of Siranoush Avedikian in Zena Gunther street (at the time Nikephoros Phocas street). After Saint George’s church was built (1939–1940) in Platon street (it was later renamed to Vassilis Michaelides street), lessons were held at the church’s repository. Thanks to the encouragement of priest Shahé Semerdjian, expenditure from the Armenian Prelature of Cyprus and a donation by Ethiopian Armenian Roupen Babigian, in 1951 a proper school building was erected for the National Armenian School (Հայ Ազգային Վարժարան) next to the church, which Prelate Ghevont Chebeyan inaugurated on 17 November 1951. In 1954, with contributions from a fund-raising by the Limassol Armenian youth, the building was expanded and as of then all lessons were held inside the school building.

Between 1995–1996, a pre-fabricated kindergarten was built. However, to enjoy facilities equal to that of the Nicosia and Larnaca schools, the Technical Services of the Ministry of Education and Culture built between 2006–2007 a modern two-storey school on the same grounds, with Aristos Christodoulides as its architect; during the construction period, the educational work was carried out at a rented house in Philoctetes street. The new school was inaugurated on 5 November 2008 by President Demetris Christofias. Currently, it has about 40 students.

To the right hand side of the main entrance there is a marble commemorative plaque in Greek reading:

Το Αρμενικό Δημοτικό Σχολείο Ναρέκ ανεγέρθη από την κυπριακή κυβέρνηση σε χώρο που εκχωρήθηκε από την Αρμενική Εκκλησία και εγκαινιάστηκε από την Αυτού Εξοχότητα τον Πρόεδρο της Κυπριακής Δημοκρατίας κ. Δημήτρη Χριστόφια την 5η Νοεμβρίου 2008 - Επί θητείας του Εκπροσώπου της Αρμενικής Κοινότητας στη Βουλή των Αντιπροσώπων κ. Βαρτκές Μαχτεσιάν (The Nareg Armenian Elementary School was constructed by the government of Cyprus on a ground ceded by the Armenian Church and was inaugurated by His Excellency the President of the Republic of Cyprus Mr Demetris Christofias on the 5th of November 2008 - During the term of the Representative of the Armenian Community in the House of Representatives Mr Vartkes Mahdessian)

To the side of the entrance, from the inside part of it, there is another marble commemorative plaque in Armenian reading:

Սոյն յուշաքարը զետեղուեցաւ առ ի ճանաչում Պետական Ներկայացուցիչներ Պետրոս Գալյճեանի (sic) եւ Տոքթ Վահագն Ադամեանի նախաձեռնութեան եւ ջանքերուն, որոնց շնորհիւ իրականացաւ դպրոցաշէնքին կառուցումը (This commemorative plaque was placed in acknowledgement of the initiative and the efforts of the State Representatives Bedros Kalaydjian and Dr. Vahakn Atamyan, thanks to whom the construction of the school building was realised)

=== Famagusta ===
The smallest member of Nareg Schools’ family, with no more than 15 students, it has been under Turkish occupation since August 1974. It started operating in late 1927 under the name National Armenian School (Հայ Ազգային Վարժարան) with financial aid by the Reformed Presbyterian Mission at the house of Miss Hayarpi Der Kevorkian, opposite the Ayia Zoni church. As the school was never fortunate to have its own building, over the years it operated in various rented houses at different locations of Varosha; Divine Liturgies were held at these rented houses. Its last premises were located in 28 October street. In 1972 it was called Nareg National School (Նարեկ Ազգային Վարժարան), just like the other three Armenian schools of the island and its last teacher was Marie Der Avedissian. It was taken over during the 1974 Turkish invasion and has since been in the fenced area of Varosha.

=== Others ===
In the past, an Armenian school also operated in Pano Amiandos (1928–1939 and 1942–1948), under the auspices of Tunnel Asbestos Co., with Garabed Dzaghigian as its teacher; Garabed Dzaghigian was the teacher of the short-lived Armenian schools in Mavrovouni (1939–1942) and Prodhromos (1938–1942); the Mavrovouni Armenian School operated under the auspices of the Cyprus Mines Corporation. During the World War II evacuation (1941–1942), Armenian schools operated in the villages of Agros, Anaphotia, Pano Lefkara, Ormidhia, Pedhoulas, Pervolia, Prodhromos and Skouriotissa. The Pedhoulas school was the largest one, with Haigazoun Hagopian as its teacher.

There was also a small Armenian school at the Magaravank in Pentadhaktylos (1897–1914) and a small Armenian school at Attalou settlement (near Kharcha village, 1910–1922); during its last years, the latter had Archimandrite Krikor Bahlavouni as its teacher, also known as "Topal Vartabed". In Nicosia, there was a small Armenian kindergarten in (1900–1905), run by the Armenian Evangelical sisters Rachel and Hosanna Sarkissian.

The majority of the old Armenian schools were in Larnaca: chronologically, a small Armenian school for refugee children of the Hamidian massacres, under the auspices of Reformed Presbyterian missionary Susan Fluhart (1896–1899), a small Armenian school under the auspices of the American Academy of Larnaca (1916–1918, with Hagop Davidian as its teacher, and again between 1923–1936 as a 4–class Elementary School, with various teachers), a small Armenian Catholic school in Larnaca (1921–1923), run by Abbot Jean Kouyoumdjian at Saint Joseph's convent, and a small Armenian kindergarten under the auspices of the Reformed Presbyterian Mission (1923–1929), with Josephine Gulesserian as its teacher. There were also three short-lived Armenian schools in Larnaca in 1922–1923, as a result of the huge influx of refugees from the Armenian genocide; these were run by Haroutiun Kalaydjian, Verkin Abadjian and the Protestant Satenig Derderian.

Of particular importance was the National Educational Orphanage (Ազգային Կրթարան-Որբանոց), which was founded by Vahan Kurkjian (also known as Pagouran), in order to educate orphaned Armenian children from the Hamidian massacres. It operated in Nicosia and, during the summer months, at the Magaravank between 1897–1904. It was closed down because of financial difficulties and Kurkjian's loss of two of his children due to a whooping cough epidemic. Its students later became successful and influential, some in Cyprus, others in the Armenian Diaspora.

== Gallery ==
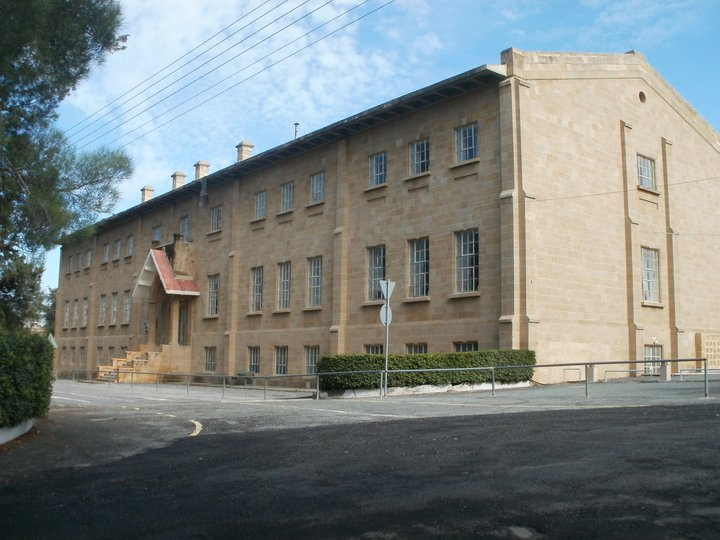
The Melkonian girls building

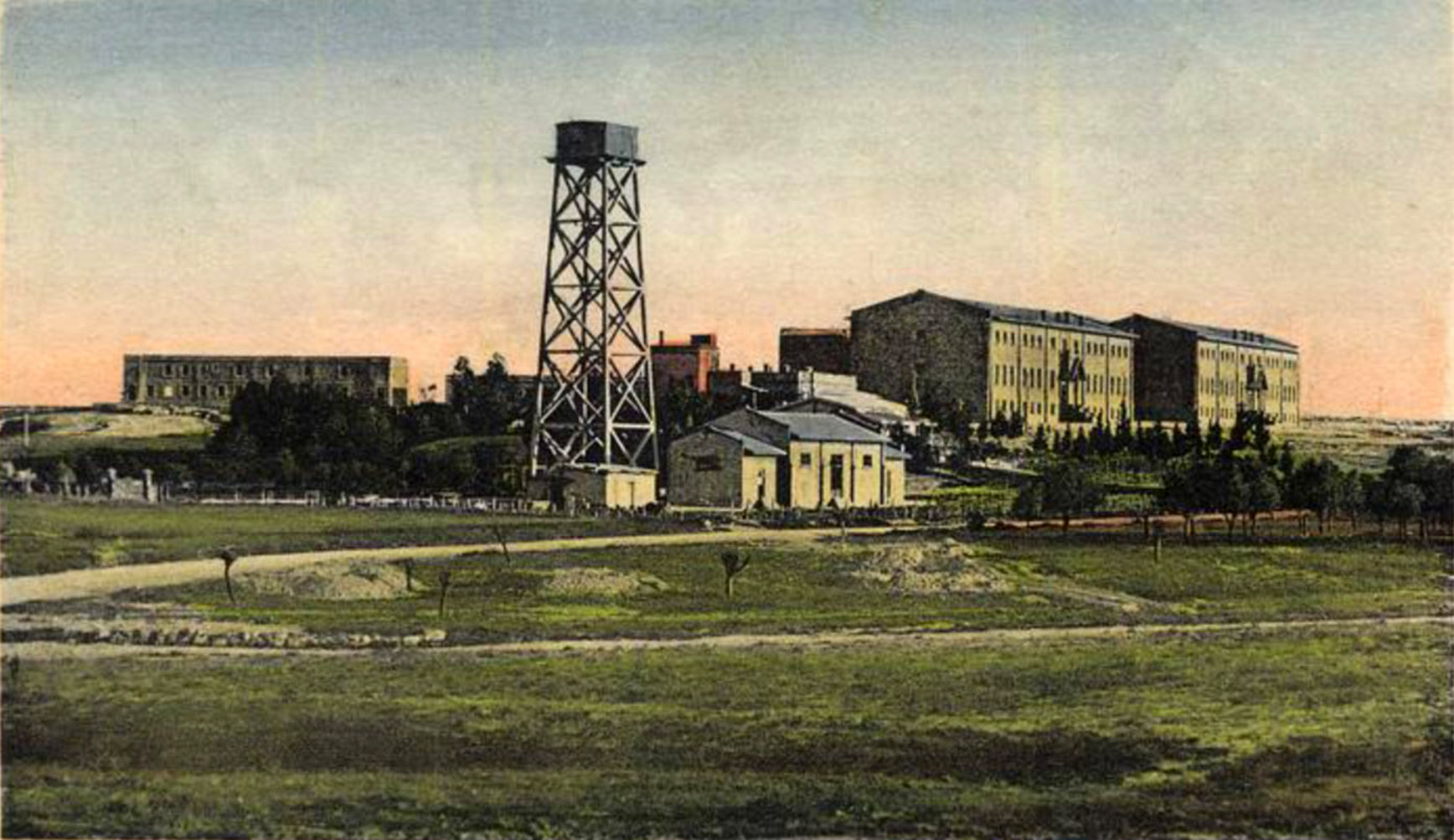
Panoramic view of the Melkonian Educational Institute (1926)

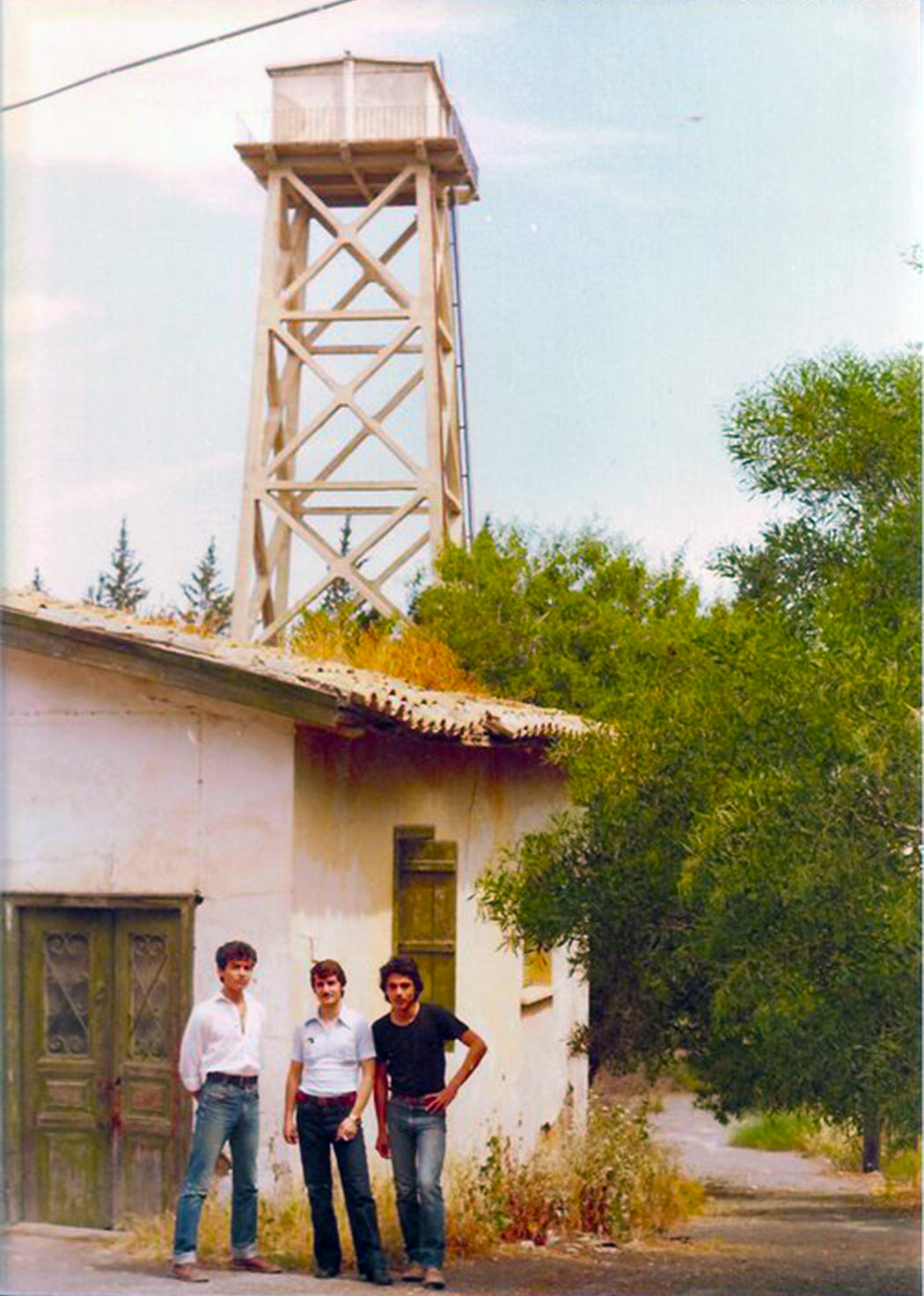
Melkonian students under the famous watertower (1981)
