= Karpis Surenian =

Karpis Surenian (Armenian: Կարպիս Սուրենյան; August 21, 1925 – October 5, 2011) was an Armenian prose writer, essayist, translator, literary critic, and art historian. He is widely recognized for his translations of world classics into Armenian, particularly the psychological novels of Fyodor Dostoevsky.

== Biography ==
Karpis Surenian was born Karpis Sarkavagian on August 21, 1925, in Athens, Greece, to an ethnic Armenian family. He later moved to Nicosia, Cyprus, to pursue his secondary education. There, he studied at the prestigious Melkonian Educational Institute, a prominent cultural and educational hub for the diaspora.

In 1946, following the conclusion of World War II, Surenian participated in the mass repatriation movement that saw tens of thousands of diaspora Armenians migrate to Soviet Armenia. He settled in Yerevan, the capital city, where he spent the rest of his life. Surenian became an active participant in the local literary community and a member of the Writers' Union of Armenia. He died in Yerevan on October 5, 2011, at the age of 86.

== Works ==
=== Original publications ===
Surenian's original bibliography primarily consists of philosophical essays, psychological novellas, short stories, and published diaries:

- Old Story («Հին պատմություն»)
- The Truth is Life («Ճիշտը կյանքն է»)
- Pure Hands («Մաքուր ձեռքեր»)
- Where Are You Originally From? («Բնիկ որտեղացի՞ եք», 1969) – A critically acclaimed collection of essays exploring Armenian national identity, cultural roots, and repatriation.
- Sons of the Sun («Արևորդիներ», 1978) – A collection of biographical and philosophical essays profiling iconic Armenian figures, including painter Martiros Saryan and poet Avetik Isahakyan.
- Island of Bliss («Երանության կղզին»)
- Diary 1943–2000 («Օրագիր 1943-2000», 2005) – A massive personal and historical archive spanning over half a century of cultural life in the Armenian diaspora and Soviet Armenia.
- Fortresses of the Spirit («Ոգու ամրոցներ», posthumous) – A collection focusing on cultural philosophy and literary criticism.

=== Major translations ===
- Fyodor Dostoevsky: The Brothers Karamazov (2 volumes) and The Idiot
- John Galsworthy: The Forsyte Saga (4 volumes)
- Leo Tolstoy: Selected autobiographical essays and moral-philosophical treatises.
- Virginia Woolf: Various stream-of-consciousness essays and short fiction pieces.
