= Larnaca Armenian school =

Armenian school in Larnaca, Cyprus

Nareg Armenian School
- Αρμενικό Σχολείο Ναρέκ (Greek); Նարեկ Հայկական Վարժարան (Armenian)
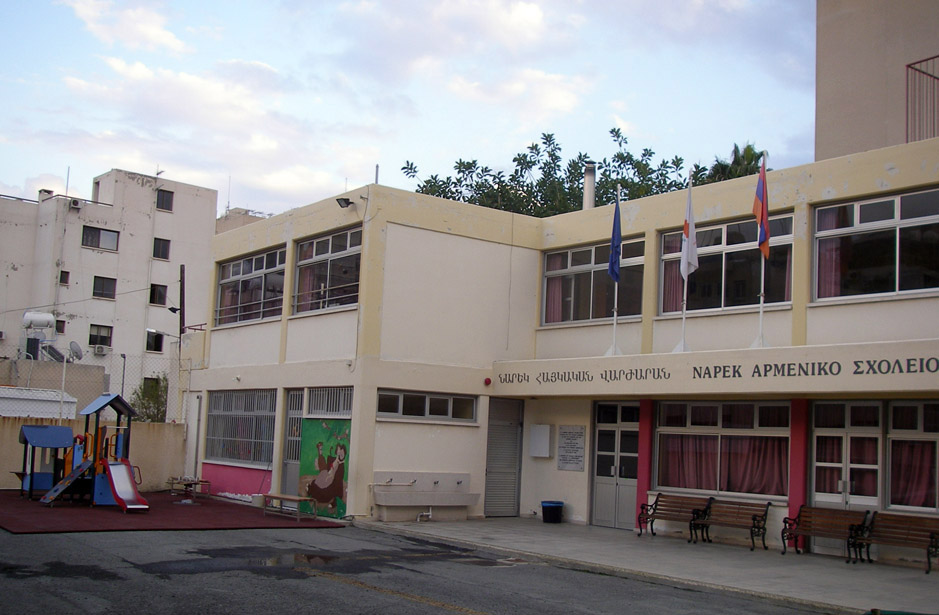
- Main entrance view

Location
- Larnaca, Cyprus
- 34°54′52″N 33°38′8″E

Information
- Founded: 1909; 117 years ago
- School district: Larnaca

The Nareg Armenian School (Greek: Αρμενικό Σχολείο Ναρέκ; Armenian: Նարեկ Հայկական Վարժարան), also known as the Larnaca Armenian School, is located on 21, Armenian church street in central Larnaca, next to the Sourp Stepanos (Saint Stephen) church. Since 1972, Armenian Elementary Schools in Cyprus (Nicosia, Larnaca, Limassol and, until 1974, Famagusta) are called Nareg, in memory of Saint Krikor Naregatsi (951-1003).

The current building was built between 1993-1995 by the Technical Services of the Ministry of Education and was inaugurated on 18 May 1996 by the then-President of Cyprus Glafcos Clerides. Currently, the school has about 25 students. As with the other Nareg Schools (in Nicosia and Limassol), Vera Tahmazian has been the Headmistress since 2009, and the school is under the tutelage of the Armenian Schools of Cyprus Committee.

The first Armenian school in Larnaca operated in 1909 by Rebecca Gomidassian. Soon, Adana Prelate Moushegh Seropian donated funds for the construction of a small school building, thus the school was called "Mousheghian" National School. In 1917, Miss Hanemie Eramian donated funds for the construction of another room, next to the church. The large influx of refugee survivors of the Armenian Genocide made imperative the use of a larger building. So, in 1923 the "Armenian National School" was built by the Adana Educational Association, while in 1926 another floor was added with the generous contribution of Garabed Melkonian, one of the founders of the Melkonian Educational Institute. The old school premises provided shelter for some of the Lebanese-Armenian refugees, who came to Cyprus between 1975-1990.

== See also ==
- Armenian Cypriots
- Armenian Prelature of Cyprus
- Sourp Stepanos Church, Larnaca
