= Sourp Stepanos Church, Larnaca =

Church building in Cyprus

Coordinates: 34.914931°N 33.635556°E

Sourp Stepanos Church (Armenian: Սուրբ Ստեփանոս Եկեղեցի; Saint Stephen) is the Armenian Apostolic church in Larnaca, Cyprus.

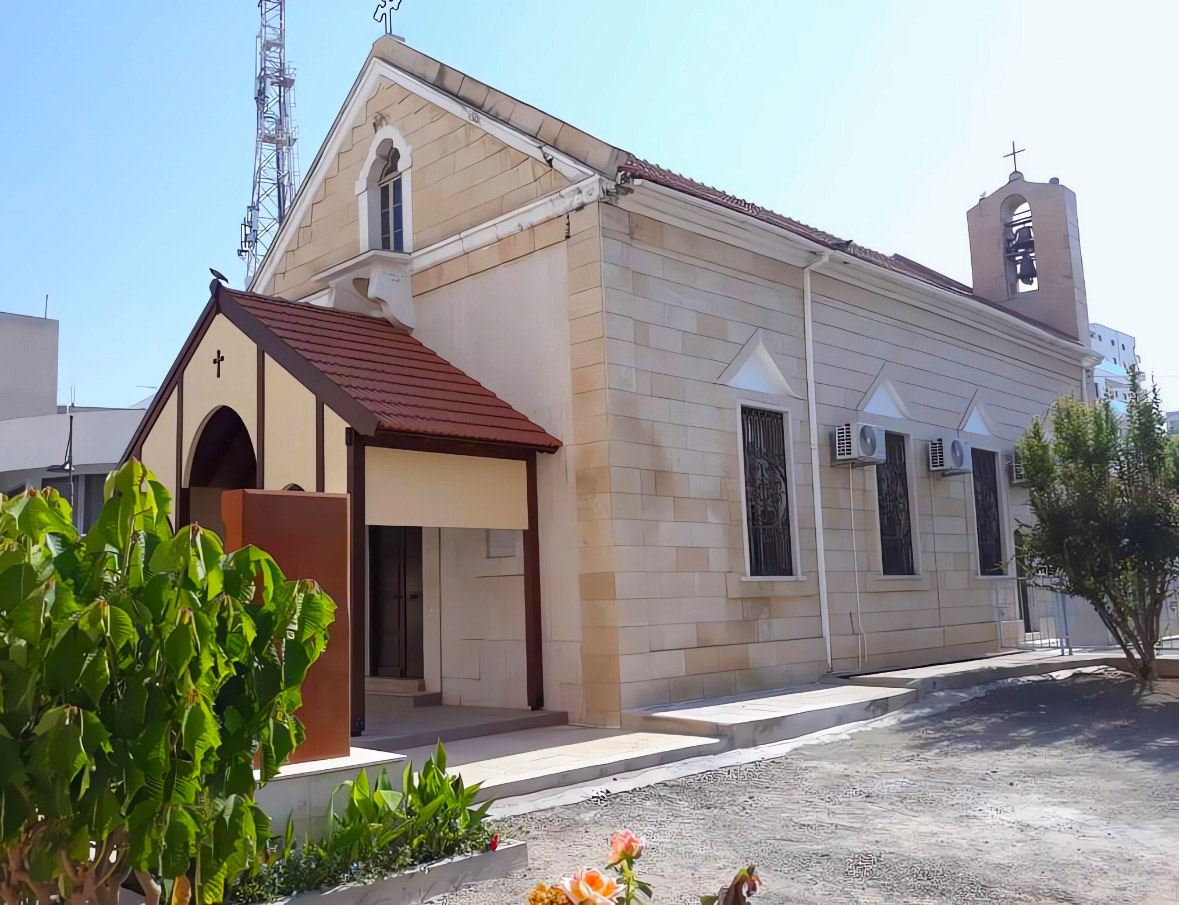
General view of Sourp Stepanos church

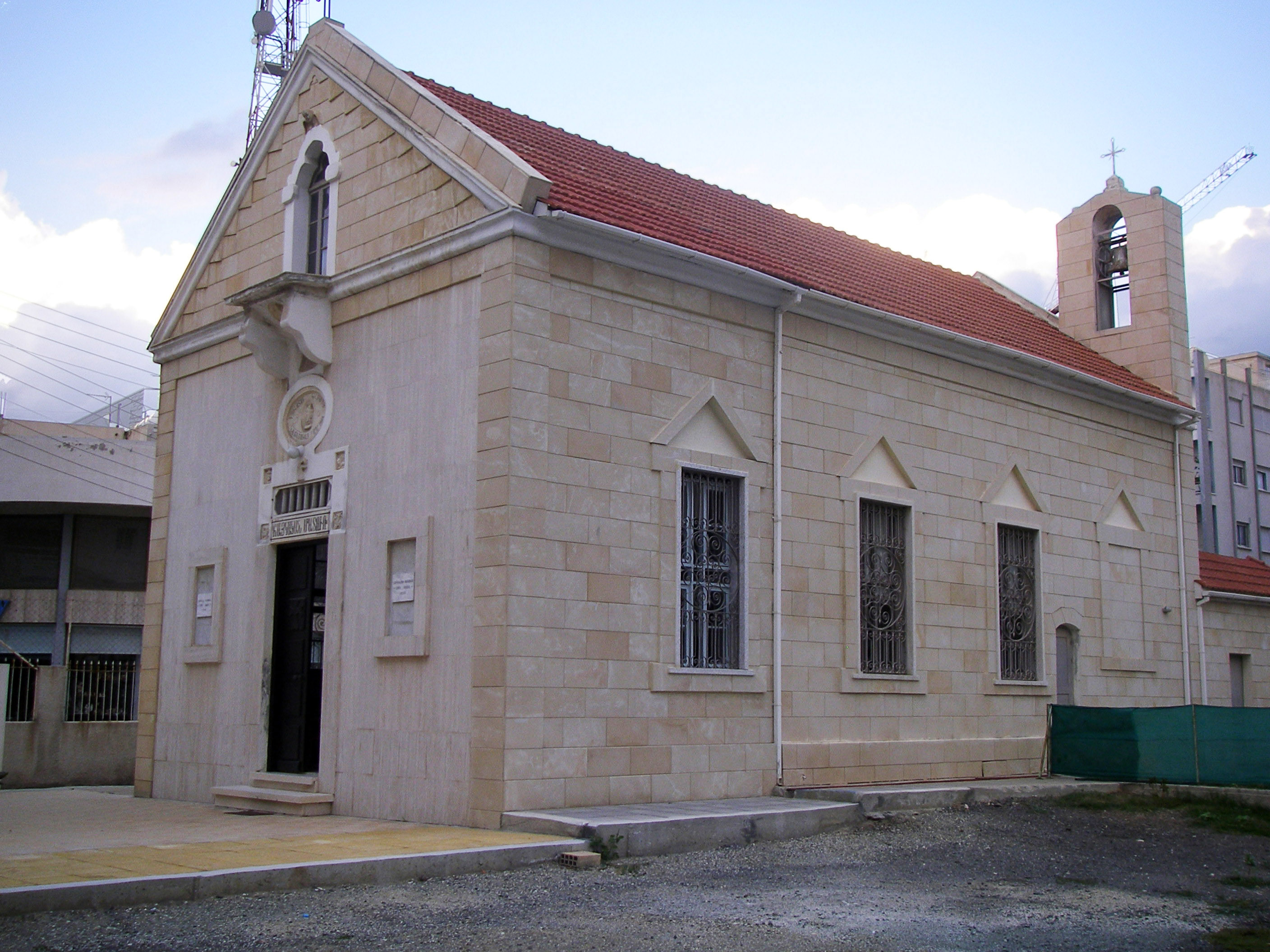
Sourp Stepanos church in Larnaca

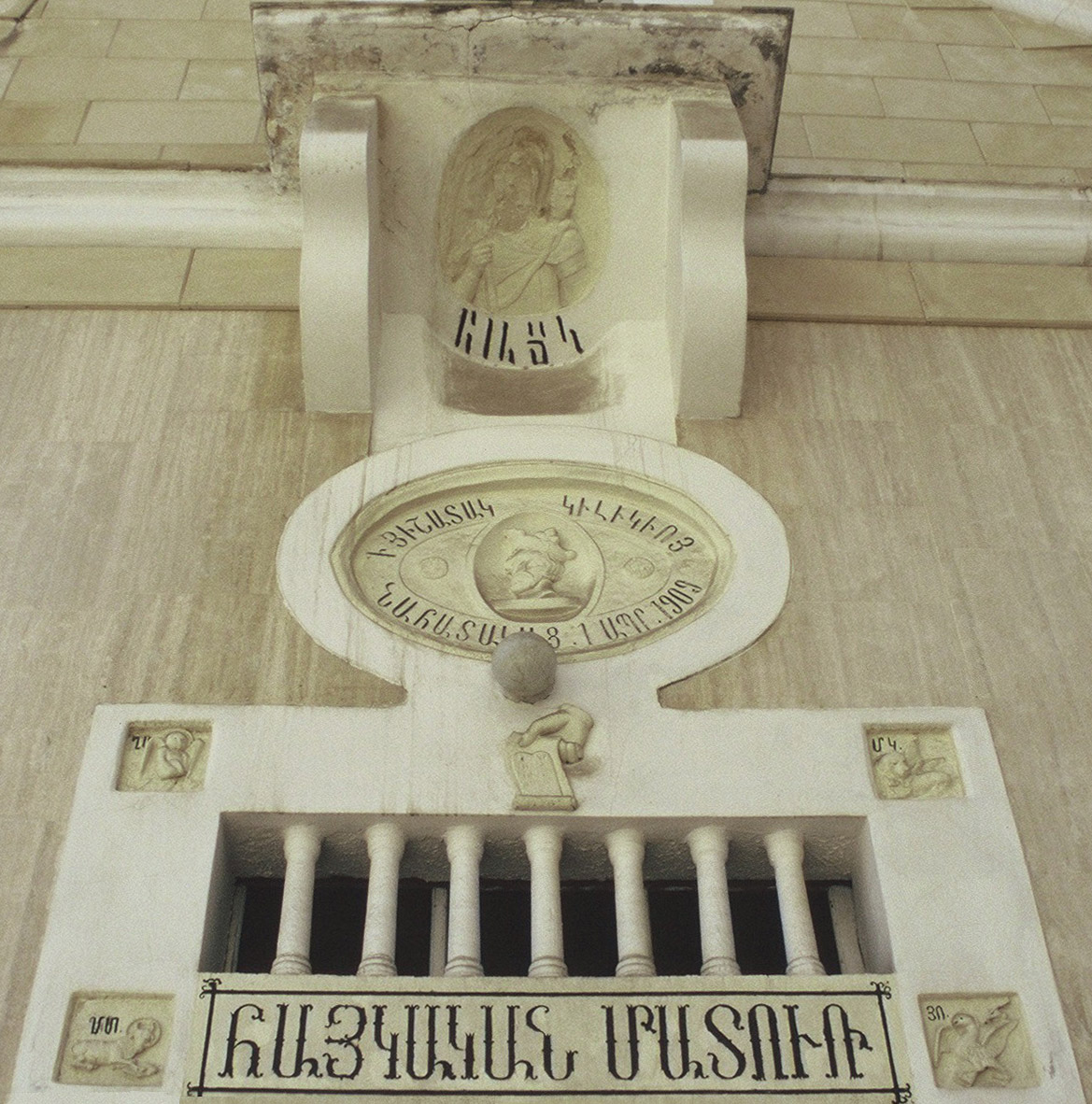

The church is located in Larnaca's town centre and was originally built in 1909 as a small chapel, in memory of Adana's patron Saint, Sourp Stepanos (Saint Stephen), by Armenian refugees who fled the Adana massacre. Following a fund-raising in 1912 and 1913, the church was completed on 1st April 1913. The church was inaugurated on 20 April 1914 by Senior Archimandrite Serovpe Samvelian and it was consecrated on 30 June 1918 by Archbishop Taniel Hagopian. According to the commemorative inscription in front of the entrance, it was built "In memory of the Cilician Martyrs - 1st April 1909". It is considered to be the first monument in the world for the Armenian massacres, even before the Armenian Genocide.

The church is decorated with beautiful icons and its altar is made of wood (1909). The central icon was painted in 1913. It was renovated between 1956-1957, in 1998, between 2022-2023 and again in 2025. An external narthex (kavit) was constructed between 2020-2021, and it was inaugurated and consecrated by Archbishop Khoren Toghramadjian on 25 December 2021.

In 2011, a khachkar (cross-stone) was placed before the entrance of the church, dedicated to the centenary of the Adana massacre and the myriads of Armenian martyrs; it was consecrated on 25 December 2011 by Archbishop Varoujan Hergelian. The church is located in the same grounds with the local Nareg Armenian Elementary School, whose previous building used to be adjacent to the church, before the current building was erected between 1993-1995.

Since 9 January 1992, the parish priest is archpriest Mashdots Ashkarian.

== See also ==
- Armenians in Cyprus
- Armenian Prelature of Cyprus
- Larnaca Armenian school
