= Charkeia =

Charkeia: Χάρκεια/Χάρτζια (Greek); Karaağaç (Turkish)
- Village
- Location in Cyprus
- Coordinates: 35°19′12″N 33°33′20″E
- Country (de jure): Cyprus
  - District: Kyrenia District
- Country (de facto): Northern Cyprus
  - District: Girne District
- Time zone: UTC+2 (EET)
  - Summer (DST): UTC+3 (EEST)

Charkeia or Chartzia (Greek: Χάρκεια/Χάρτζια, Turkish: Karaağaç) is a village in the Kyrenia District of Cyprus, east of Kyrenia. It is under the de facto control of Northern Cyprus.

== Chartzia Roman Tombs and Archaeology of the area ==
It is believed that in Roman times, Cyprus and this region was more populated than it is today. There are well preserved Byzantine tombs. The stone steps lead dawn to eight subterranean chambers, all hewn out of the solid rock with r remarkable precision for the crude tools of those days. The tomb architecture is exactly the same as in the catacombs of Kyrenia, using similar tool markings can be seen above arched entrance. There are a number of other tombs here, whose entrances are concealed by the evergreen shrub, "Skinia" with the entrances blocked by large stones. This necropolis is a sure sign of a near-by Byzantine town.

Continuing towards the sea we come to fields with piles of stones in the v, or piled up to form field boundaries, and close examination reveals that they must have come from buildings. Here there are several ancient quarries where the workings have been converted into small rectangular houses, one of which is shown in fig. 42. We are now on the outskirts of the ancient town and between the quarries arid the cove is a small flat piece of land strewn with stones and masses of pottery sherds of all ages, ranging from Byzantine, through mediaeval to the pre plastic era of 50 years ago. The theory of continuous occupation from Roman to medieval times is supported by the presence of another necropolis, of a different type, close to the cliffs on the east. Here there are piles of stones in heaps concealed by "skinia" bushes, with here and there carved stones that seem to be of a much later date, but they are not catacombs. Visitors to Cyprus always remark about so much pottery sherds lying about the countryside.
