= Melkonian Educational Institute =

Former Armenian boarding school in Nicosia, Cyprus

- Մելգոնեան Կրթական Հաստատութիւն (Armenian); Εκπαιδευτικό Ινστιτούτο Μελκονιάν (Greek)
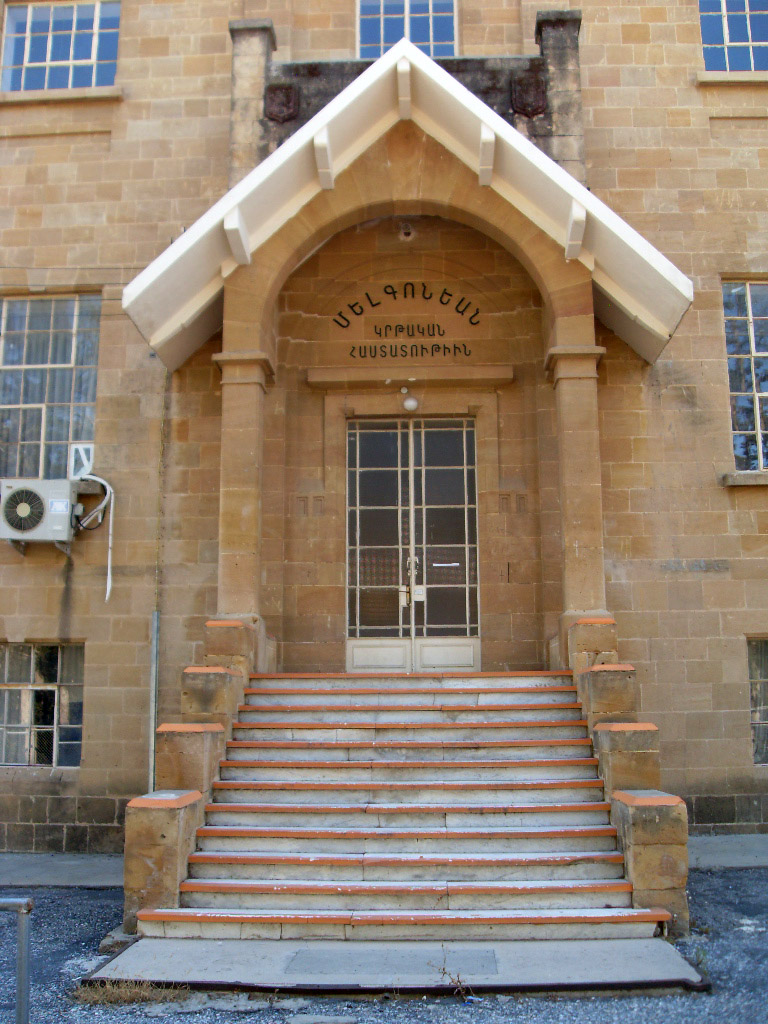
- View of the entrance

Location
- Nicosia; Cyprus
- Coordinates: 35°9′0″N 33°22′34″E

Information
- Type: Private Boarding school
- Established: 1926; 100 years ago
- Closed: 2005; 21 years ago
- Colors: Blue, Red

The Melkonian Educational Institute (MEI) (Armenian: Մելգոնեան Կրթական Հաստատութիւն (ՄԿՀ); Greek: Εκπαιδευτικό Ινστιτούτο Μελκονιάν) was an Armenian boarding school of high academic standard located in Nicosia, Cyprus.

Established in 1926 by the Melkonian brothers, it was the only remaining boarding school servicing students of the Armenian Diaspora from about 40 countries. Maintained by the Armenian General Benevolent Union, a decision to close down the school in 2005 caused controversy among the Armenian-Cypriot community and especially among former students.

The Melkonian's current status is uncertain.

== History ==
=== Early history ===
The Melkonian Educational Institute was created as an orphanage in the aftermath of the Armenian Genocide of 1915–1923. Armenian Patriarch Zaven I Der Yeghiayan of Constantinople was the first Headmaster of the Institute, who in April 1926 undertook the difficult task of traveling and collecting over 300 orphans, boys and girls, from amongst thousands of children left destitute on the plains of Eastern Anatolia and in the neighboring countries as a result of the Armenian Genocide.

The Melkonian Institute as a safe haven is therefore regarded as being closely connected with the dark pages of the early 20th century's Armenian history. This is confirmed by the fact that hundreds of orphans were provided with shelter, sustenance and schooling thanks to the enormous gift bequeathed by the immortal benefactors, brothers Garabed and Krikor Melkonian. On Friday, 15 February 1924, the foundational stone was laid and the construction of Melkonian Establishments began in Nicosia. Melkonian School opened its gates two years later, in 1926.

=== The Melkonian Brothers ===
Brothers Krikor and Garabed Melkonian are widely regarded as the greatest benefactors of the Armenian nation. Born and raised in Caesarea, they were prominent tobacco traders from Egypt. In the aftermath of the Armenian Genocide, they decided to establish this educational institution in Cyprus. To that end, they liquidated all their assets and established the Melkonian Fund, entrusting the management of the Melkonian Educational Institute to the AGBU in perpetuity.

Both brothers are buried in the open space between the two main buildings, under the mausoleum, a beautifully designed marble monument with intricate engravings and the bronze busts of the Melkonian Brothers prominently stands as a gesture of eternal gratitude to their memory. For thousands of Melkonian graduates and friends this is a sacred place.

=== The Forest of Remembrance ===
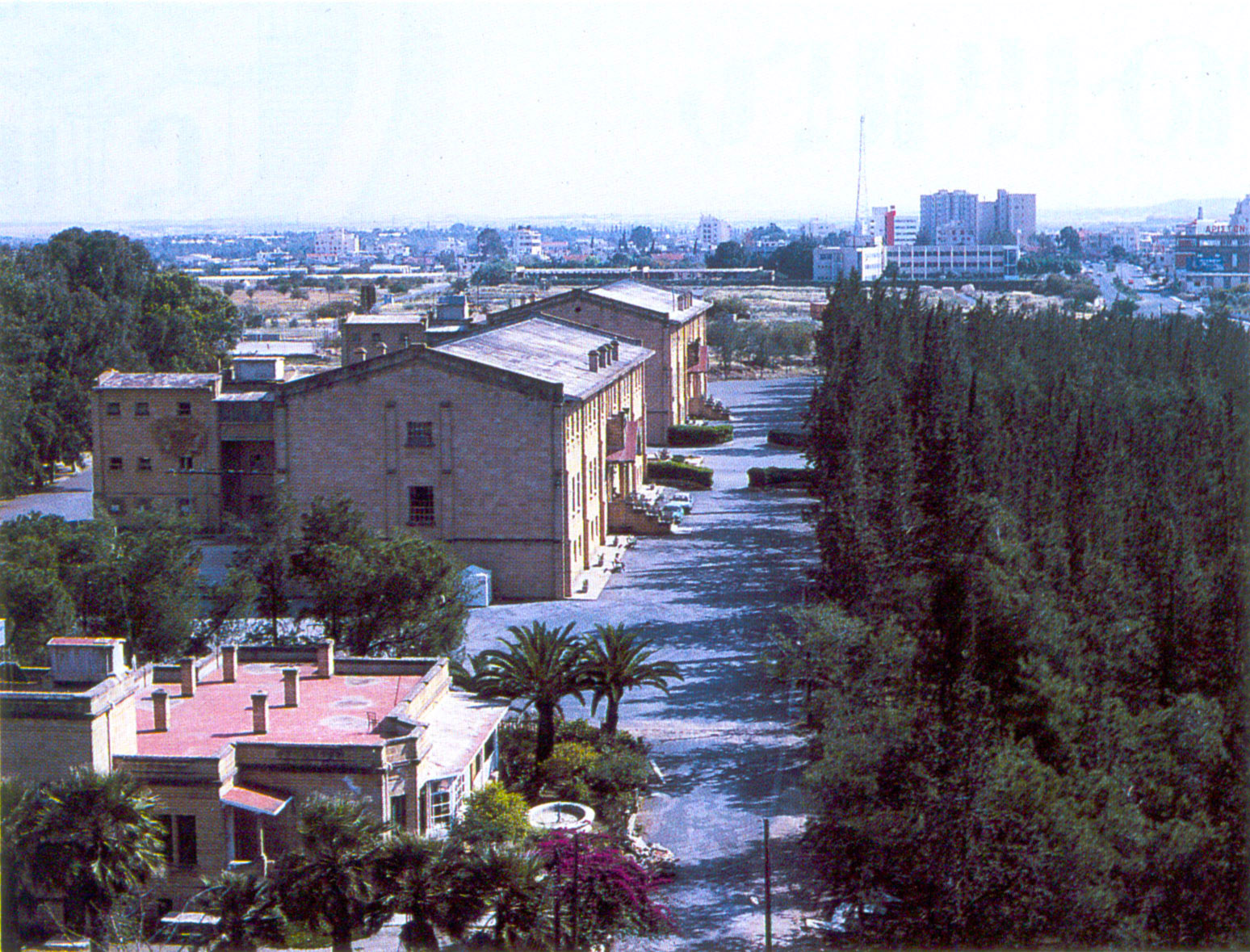
Panoramic view of the Melkonian Educational Institute (1986) and "The Forest of Remembrance" on the right

Along Limassol Avenue, occupying the foreground of the Melkonian campus, there is a grove of hundreds of cypress trees. This grove is a significant landmark and has a historic and sentimental value to the Armenian nation, as these trees were planted in the early years of the Melkonian Institute by the orphaned students, in memory of their loved ones and of the millions that perished during the Genocide. Nowhere else in the world, not even in Armenia, the Armenian Genocide is memorialised in this manner. The Cyprus government officially listed this forest, along with the historical buildings, on 2 March 2007, thanks to the efforts of Armenian MP Vartkes Mahdessian.

=== Recent history ===
On 20 July 1974, during the Turkish invasion of Cyprus, 34 bombs and incendiary rockets were dropped on the Melkonian grounds, causing extensive damages to the boys' building.

Between 1986-1988, a third of the Melkonian's estate was sold off at the Joannou & Paraskevaides company, in exchange for it undertaking the construction of the new buildings (boarding house, indoor stadium, teachers' flats) and renovating the old buildings. The new buildings (architects: Iacovos & Andreas Philippou) were constructed between 1987-1989, whereas the 6-storey Melkonian Commercial Centre (MCC) was built on Melkonian property (1990-1992, architect: Nazareth Davidian), so as to generate income for the school.

The selling of part of the Melkonian's land caused heavy criticism; many regarded that it was sold at a very low price, also questioning the legality of that act. The AGBU has also been heavily criticised for the fact that the income from the commercial centre's rent never reached the Melkonian and has been going directly to the AGBU.

=== Closure ===
The first rumours about the closure of the Melkonian started circulating in the summer of 2003. On 14 November 2003, the AGBU issued a formal statement denying the rumours. However, on 16 March 2004 The AGBU Central Board unilaterally decided to close down the Melkonian in June 2005; the first protest took place the following day.

On 26 March 2004, the Cyprus House of Representatives unanimously condemned the AGBU’s decision to close down the Melkonian, by voting Resolution 142.

Despite Pancyprian and Panarmenian reactions, the Institute was eventually closed in June 2005.

=== Lawsuit ===
In an effort to stop the closure of Melkonian, Patriarch Mesrob Mutafian of Constantinople, with the cooperation of Melkonian Alumni & Friends, based in Los Angeles, California, instigated lawsuits against the AGBU Central Board. Ninety five percent of Melkonian Alumni supported the Patriarch's lawsuit and wanted the School to remain open. Although the lawsuits failed in the United States and the Republic of Cyprus, they irreparably damaged AGBU's public image as one of the pillars of the Armenian Diaspora. Also it prevented AGBU from selling the huge Melkonian property.

== Boarding Section ==
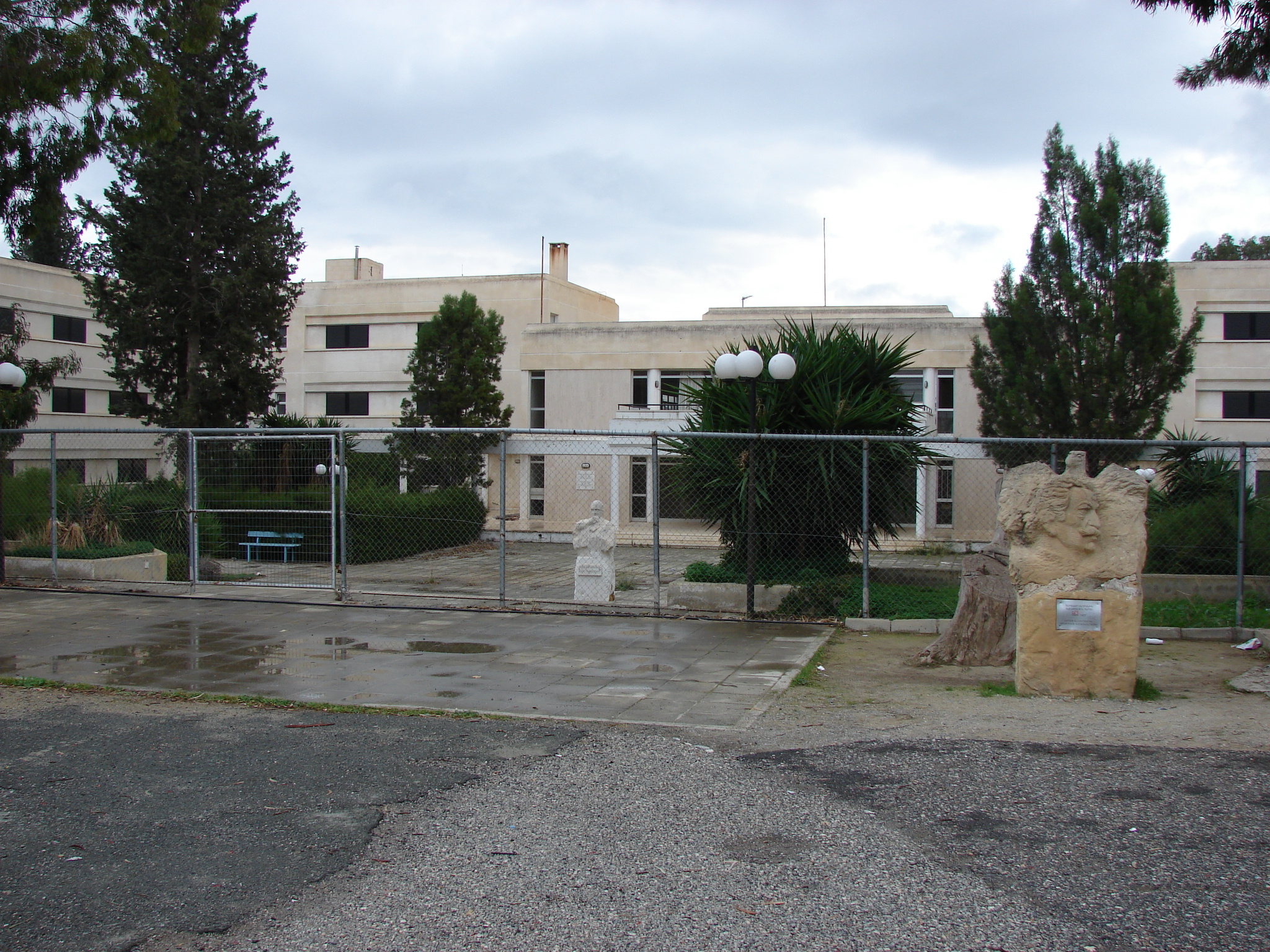
The boarding section of the Melkonian Educational Institute in Nicosia

The new boarding home was constructed between 1987-1989 for both boys and girls living in opposite wings of the complex. Its foundation stone was laid on 24 May 1987, and it was inaugurated on 21 October 1989. Alex Manoogian's bust is prominently featured at the centre of the courtyard. The boarding section had a capacity of accommodating circa 400 boarding students. Boys and girls accommodations were in separate buildings, with supervisors at the doors at all hours. The houses also included a cafeteria, where boarding students would receive their meals. There were also various areas dedicated to indoors recreational activities within this building, the largest of which was above the cafeteria with a game room, canteen and TV area.

The on-call supervisors and the resident nurse also had their offices and quarters inside this complex.

== School magazines and Publications ==
“Ayk” (Dawn), the students’ periodical of the Melkonian was first published on 13 April 1937. A source of pride for students, teachers and graduates alike, it contained writings, articles, essays, songs, poems, photographs, pictures and sketches. Ayk came out at irregular time intervals between 1937-1940, 1948-1956, 1959-1964, 1970-1982 and 1993-2006: in 1937 it was a fortnightly magazine, which became quarterly in 1938, biannual in 1939 and yearly in 1940; later on, there were two to four issues per year, until it became an annual publication in 1971.

Editors of the student publications included Vahe-Vahian, Nshan Hovhannessian, Dr Haroutiun Essegulian, and senior students Sossi Boyadjian (later Bedikian), Minas Der Sarkissian, Mesrob Kermanigian and Antranig Poladian. Later editors included Nerses Tamamian, Manuel Keosseyan, Dr Ardem Sarkissian, Assadour Devledian, Sossi Boyadjian-Bedikian (Headmistress), Dr Samuel Antossian, Kevork Khatchigian, Dr Minas Kojayan, Paren Minassian, Antranig Dakessian, Violette Tashdjian, Avedis Sabsezian, Rosette Alemian, Maggie Haladjian-Eskidjian and Yeghia Kayayan.

Another publication was the “Tsolk” (Glow) newspaper. Its founder and original editor-in-chief was Manuel Keosseyan; in 1973, Dr Minas Kojayan took over this responsibility. Tsolk was originally handwritten and was posted on the boys’ and girls’ buildings. However, as of 1979 it was typed and duplicate copies were made. It started as a weekly publication, which later on became fortnightly (1968-1973), then it came out on a monthly basis and afterwards every two months (1973-1991), with well-written articles and sketches.

More modern and luxurious was the “Hayatsk” (Glance) illustrated newspaper (1998-2000), which later on became an illustrated magazine (2000-2004). It was published three to four times a year and it hosted articles in 5 languages (Armenian, English, Russian, Bulgarian and Greek). In addition to covering school life and events, its articles also dealt with social and political issues, as well as local and foreign news. Thanks to the use of modern technology (including coloured photographs and various fonts), the guidance of its editor-in-chief Yeghia Kayayan, and the keenness and passion of the students, Hayatsk is considered a very professional publication.

== Celebrations ==
On the Sunday closest to the 14 January, the “Hokehankisd” (Memorial Service) was held in front of the Immortal Benefactors' Mausoleum, in the presence of all teachers and students, as well as members of the Armenian-Cypriot community, who would sing the Melkonian's anthem to remember the two brothers and their charitable deed. Even after the Institute's closure, the memorial is carried out annually to this day.

There were various other celebrations held throughout the school year, such as the Independence Day of Armenia in September (since 1992), the Tarkmanchats (Tarkmanchats, Day of Armenian Letters) in October, the Sovietisation Day of Armenia in November (until 1991), Christmas in December, Vartanants in February or March, the commemoration of the Armenian Genocide in April, the anniversary of the AGBU in April or May, the annual graduation in June, etc.

Of great importance was also anniversary of the Institute itself.

== Old Melkoniantsis, and the MEI Alumni ==
Growing up in close near-familial environment, Melkonian graduates (Melkoniantsi) remain friends many years after their graduation. Many Melkoniantsis, both old and young, see themselves as being part of the same Melkonian family. A number of well organised and very active MEI Alumni chapters are established in all continents of the globe. Of all Armenian schools Melkonian has produced a widely disproportionate share of Armenian Diaspora's prominent writers, intellectuals, academics, doctors, musicians, politicians, community leaders, persons of political influence and public figures on international stage. Some of prominent names associated with Melkonian include Vahan Tekeyan, Moushegh Ishkhan, Apraham Manoogian, Benon Sevan, Vahan Bedelian and Vahram Mavian.

== The Campaign to Save Melkonian ==
In 2003 an Alumni led campaign to resist the closure of Melkonian began. SaveMelkonian.org was established as campaign's information outlet, and soon attracted the attention of press, TV, political parties and numerous cultural and charity organization both in Armenia and Diaspora. Joined with Melkonian Alumni & Friends in California and many other like-minded organizations, SaveMelkonian campaign has a series of achievements in resisting AGBU's decision, which many in Armenian Diaspora regard as purely profit-driven.

=== The Melkoniantsi Club ===
On April 8, 2008, www.Melkoniantsiclub.com, an official Melkoniantsi Social Network Website was established by Mher Asadourian to keep all the Melkoniantsis, Melkonian teachers and staff united and let them communicate and keep in touch. Melkoniantsis, teachers and staff can sign up for free, upload their picture, invite friends, chat, blog, advertise, post an event, create groups and read the news.

=== Petition ===
A renewed campaign appeals to the whole Armenian nation through a petition (www.midk.org) that advocates AGBU central board in New York to finally respond and start a discussion on how the school can be reopened as soon as possible. Both management and financial resources have been made available for the reopening of the school and ensuring the successful fulfillment of its mission but AGBU central board in New York so far refuses to discuss the issue at all cost even though many of the local AGBU chapters have privately or publicly raised their concerns.

== Gallery ==
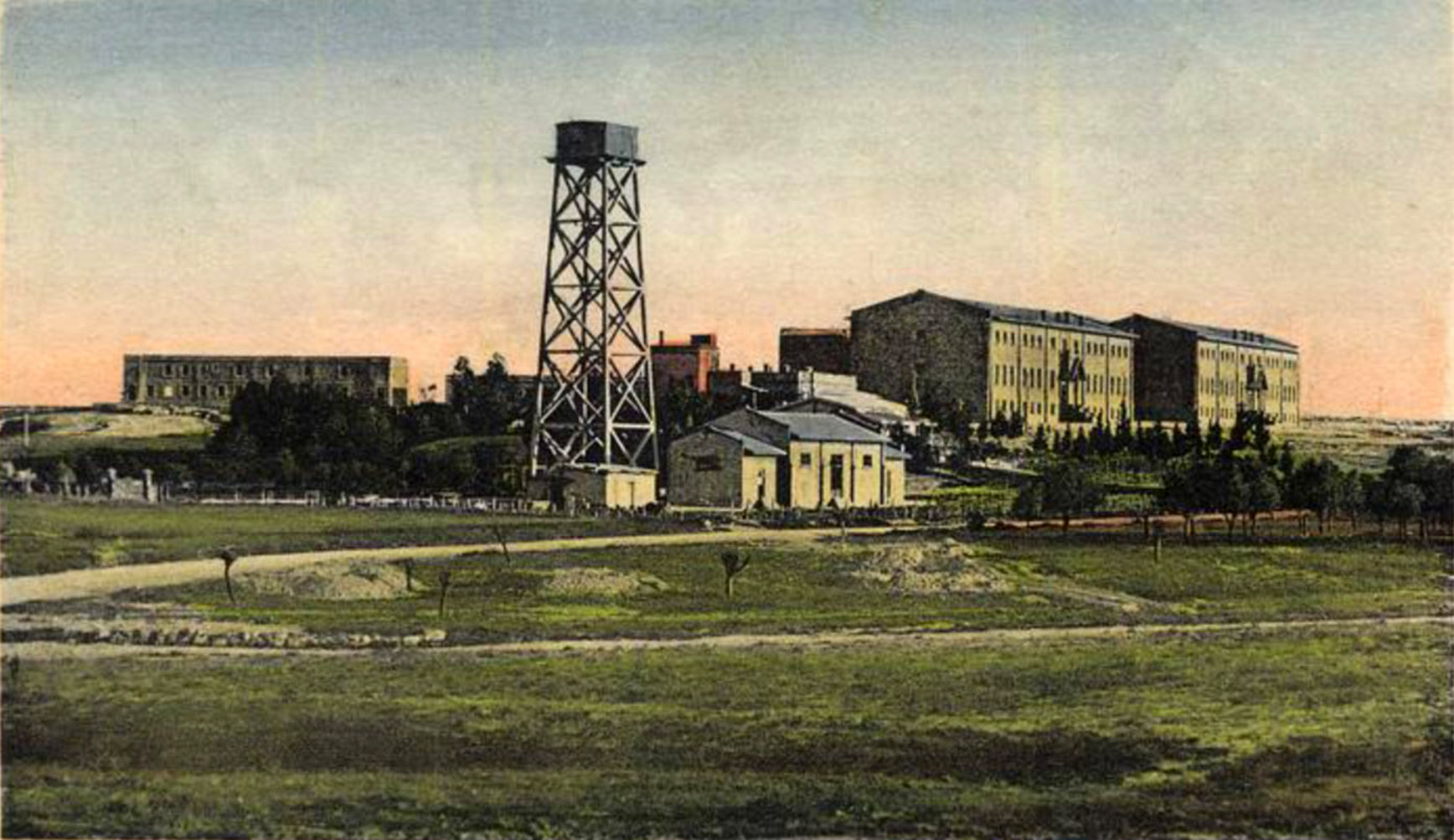
Panoramic view of the Melkonian Educational Institute

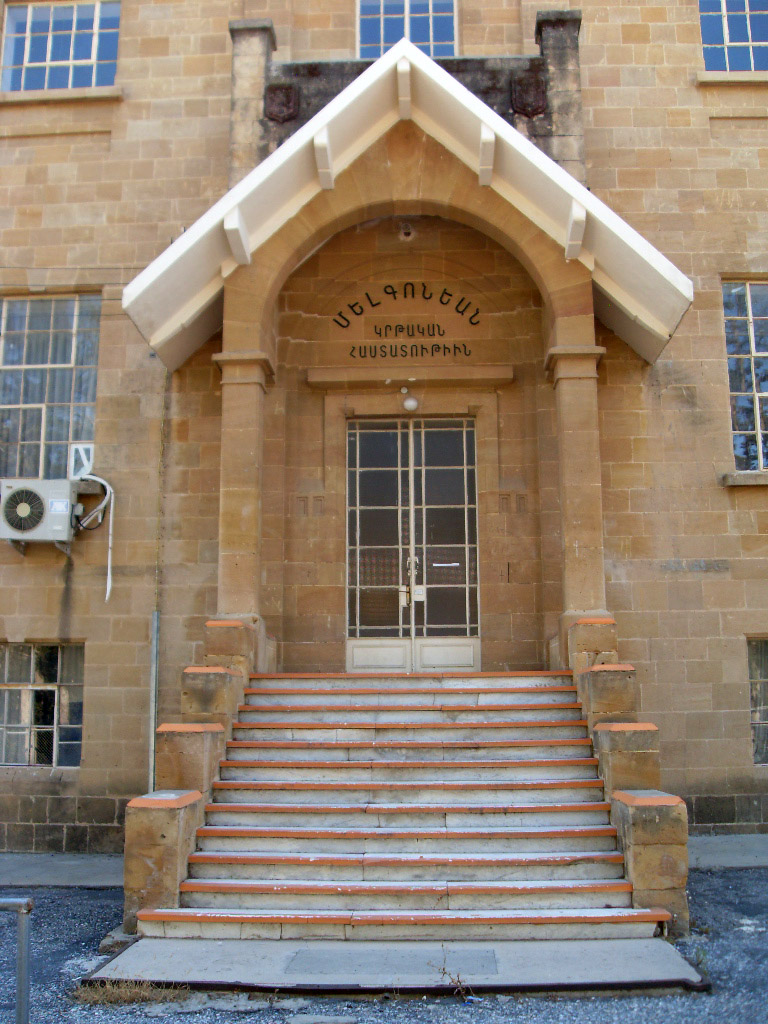
One of the entrances of the Melkonian Educational Institute in Nicosia

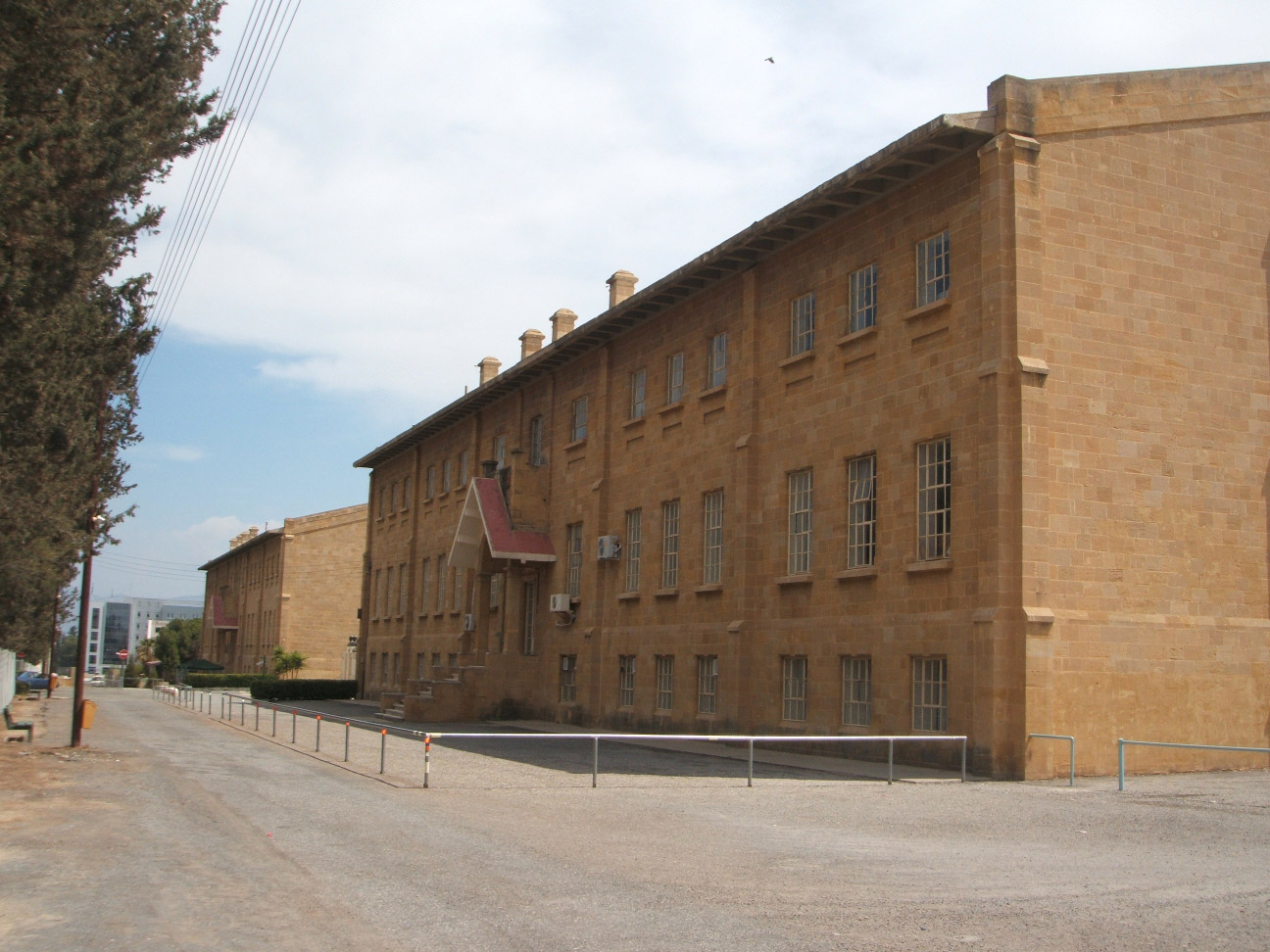
Buildings near entrance

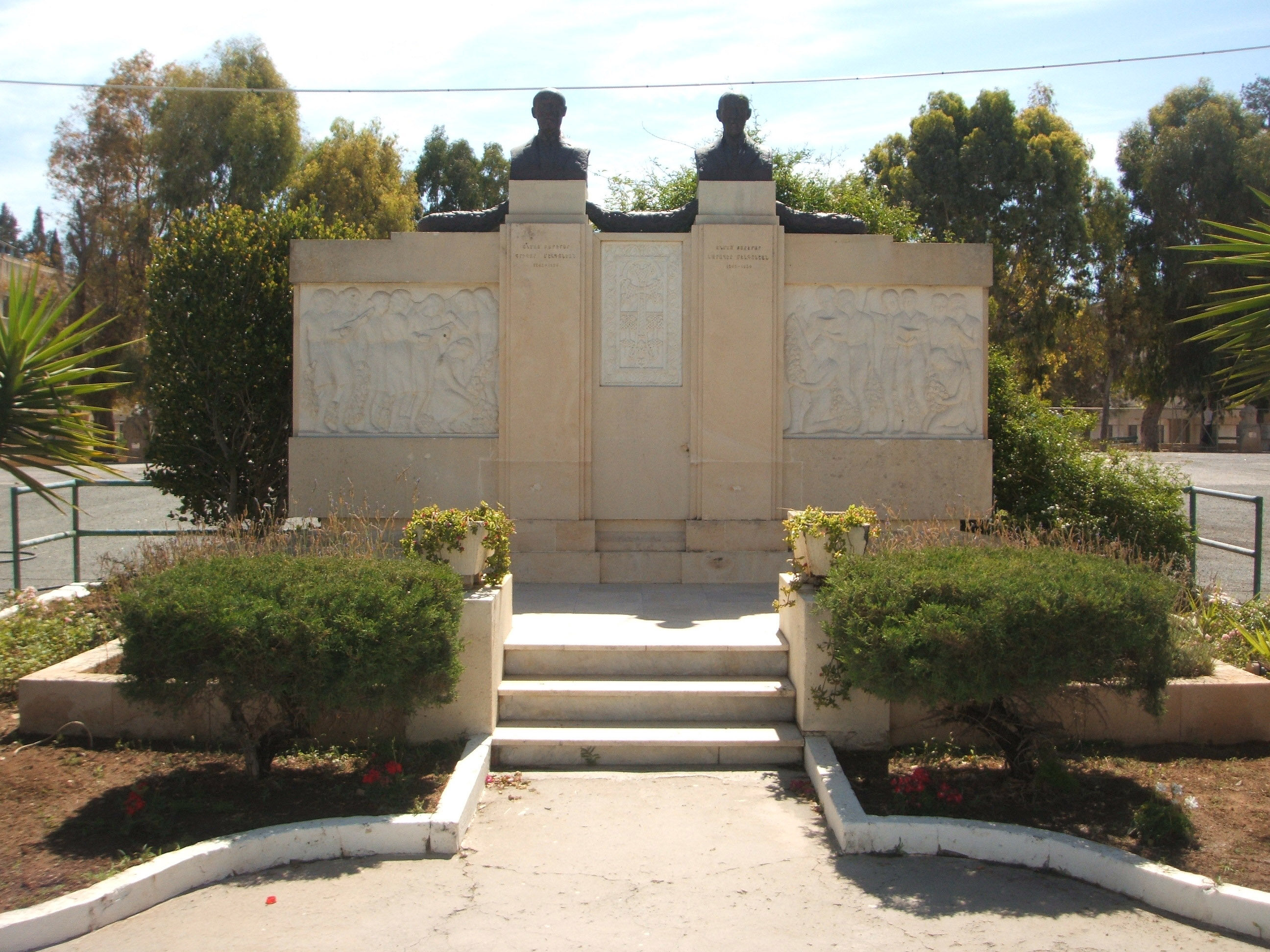
The mausoleum of Melkonian Brothers in Nicosia

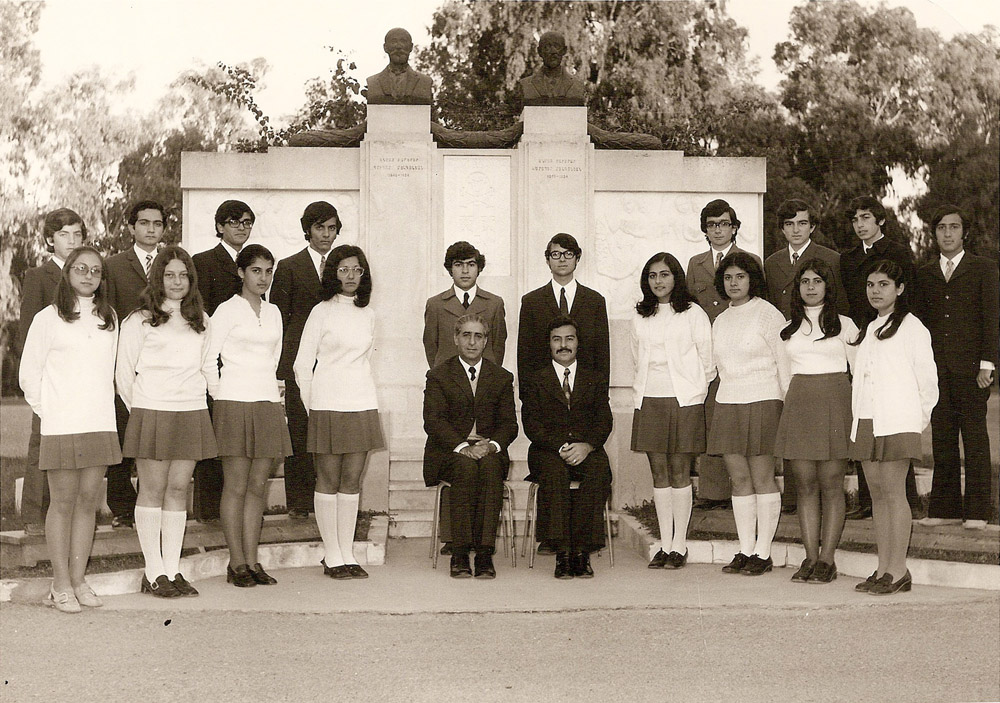
Graduating class of 1972
