= Armenian Cypriots =

Ethnic Armenians living in Cyprus

Կիպրահայեր (Armenian) Αρμένιοι της Κύπρου (Greek) Kıbrıs Ermenileri (Turkish)
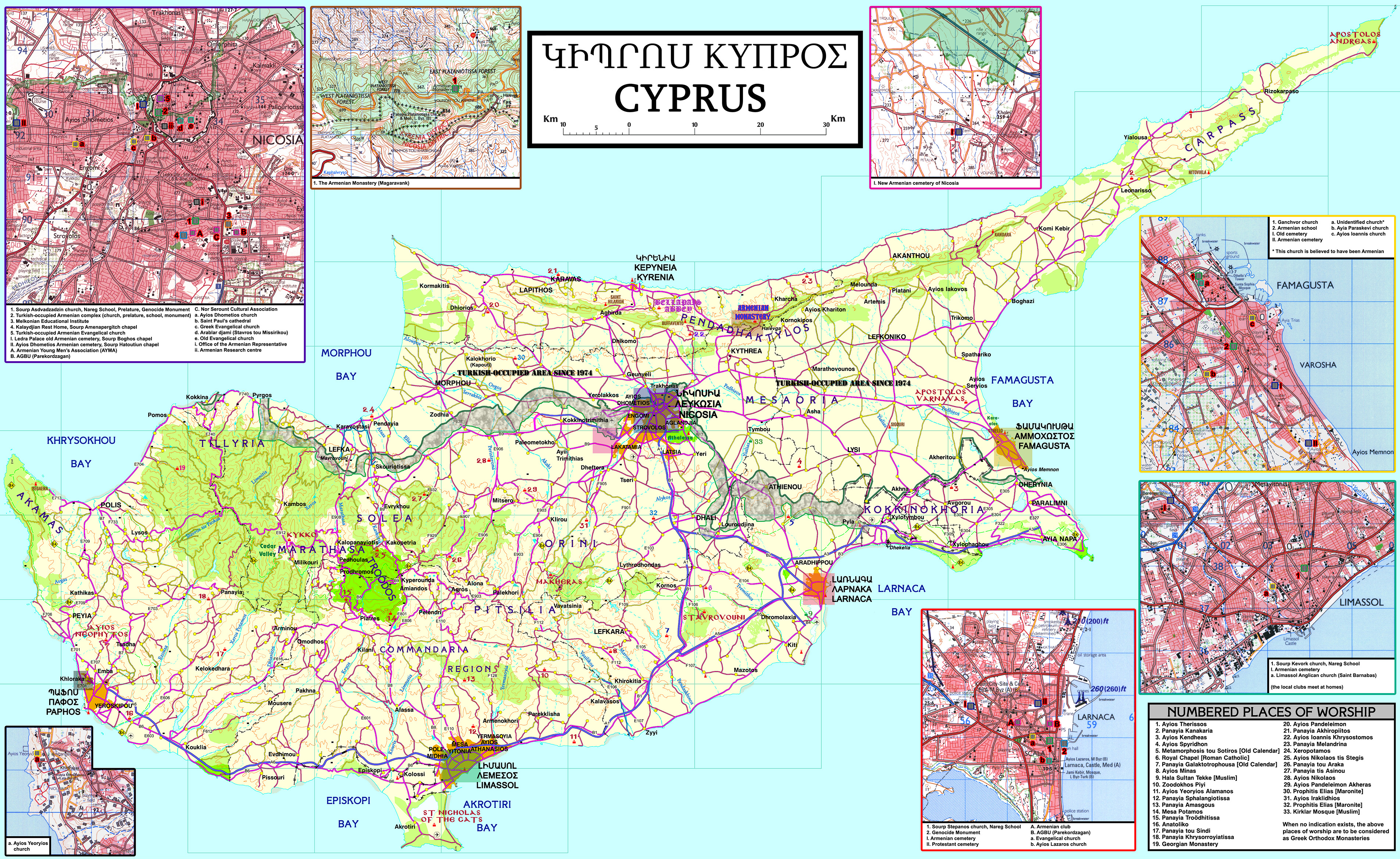
- Places of Armenian interest in Cyprus

Total population
- c. 4,000

Regions with significant populations
- Nicosia; Larnaca; Limassol

Languages
- Armenian (Western); Greek

Religion
- Christianity (Predominantly Armenian Apostolic, Catholic and Evangelical minorities)

Related ethnic groups
- Armenians in Greece, Armenians in Turkey, Armenians in the United Kingdom

Armenian Cypriots (Armenian: Կիպրահայեր, romanized: Gibrahayer; Greek: Αρμένιοι της Κύπρου, romanized: Arménioi tis Kýprou; Turkish: Kıbrıs Ermenileri) are ethnic Armenians native to Cyprus. The Armenian Cypriot community has had a significant impact upon the Armenian people as a whole despite its small numbers. During the Middle Ages, Cyprus had an extensive connection with the Armenian Kingdom of Cilicia, while the Ganchvor Monastery had an important presence in Famagusta. During the Ottoman era, the Virgin Mary church and the Magaravank were prominent. Certain Armenian Cypriots have been prominent on a Pan-Armenian or international level and survivors of the Armenian genocide have co-operated and co-existed peacefully with Turkish Cypriots.

Currently, there are around 4,000 Armenians on the island (including about 1,500 non-Cypriot Armenians), mostly centred on the capital Nicosia, but also with communities in Larnaca, Limassol and Paphos. The Armenian Prelature of Cyprus is located in Nicosia. According to the 1960 Constitution of Cyprus, Armenians, together with the Maronites and the Latins, are recognised as a "religious group" and have opted to belong to the Greek Cypriot community and Armenian Cypriots are represented by an elected Representative in the House of Representatives. The representative has been Vartkes Mahdessian since May 2006. Since July 2024, the religious leader of the community, has been Catholicosal Vicar Archbishop Gomidas Ohanian, accountable to the Catholicos of the Great House of Cilicia.

== History ==
=== Byzantine era (578–1191) ===
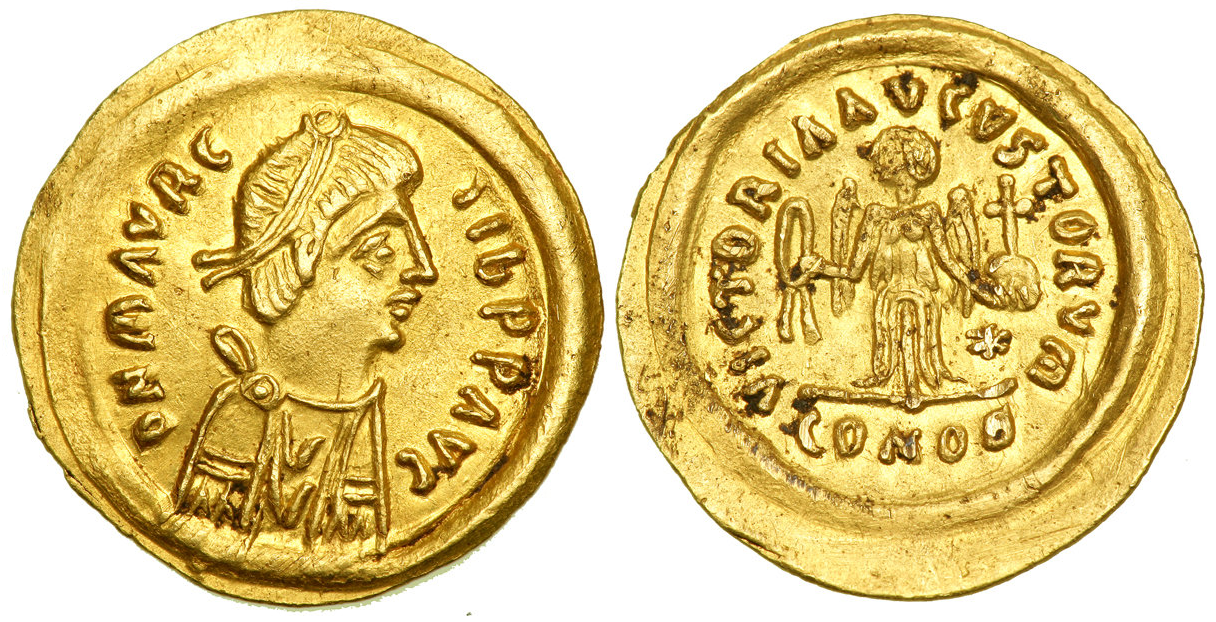
Solidus of Emperor Maurice

Armenians have had a presence in Cyprus since the 6th century. According to Theophylact Simocatta, an early 7th-century Byzantine writer, the Byzantine General Maurice the Cappadocian captured 10,090 Armenians as prisoners during his campaign against the Persian King Chosroes I; around 3,350 of these prisoners were deported to Cyprus. More Armenians arrived during the reign of the Armenian-descended emperor Heraclius for political reasons and during the pontificate of Catholicos Hovhannes III Odznetsi for commercial reasons. After the end of Arab raids in Cyprus, more arrived due to the patrician Niketas Chalkoutzes, when Armenian mercenaries were transferred to Cyprus to protect it. In the middle Byzantine period, Armenian generals and governors served in Cyprus, like Alexios Mousele or Mousere who undertook the construction of the Church of Saint Lazarus in Larnaca. It appears that it had been an Armenian Apostolic church in the 10th century and was used by Armenian-Catholics during the Latin era as well. The numerous Armenians required an analogous spiritual pastorate, and so in 973 Catholicos Khatchig I established the Armenian Bishopric in Nicosia. Relations between Cyprus and the Armenians became closer when the Kingdom of Cilicia was established. Between 1136 and 1138, Byzantine emperor John II Komnenos moved the entire population of the Armenian city of Tell Hamdun to Cyprus. After Isaac Komnenos's wedding to the daughter of the Armenian prince Thoros II in 1185, Armenian nobles and warriors came with him to Cyprus, many of whom defended the island against Richard the Lionheart, when he landed in Limassol.

=== Latin era (1191–1570) ===
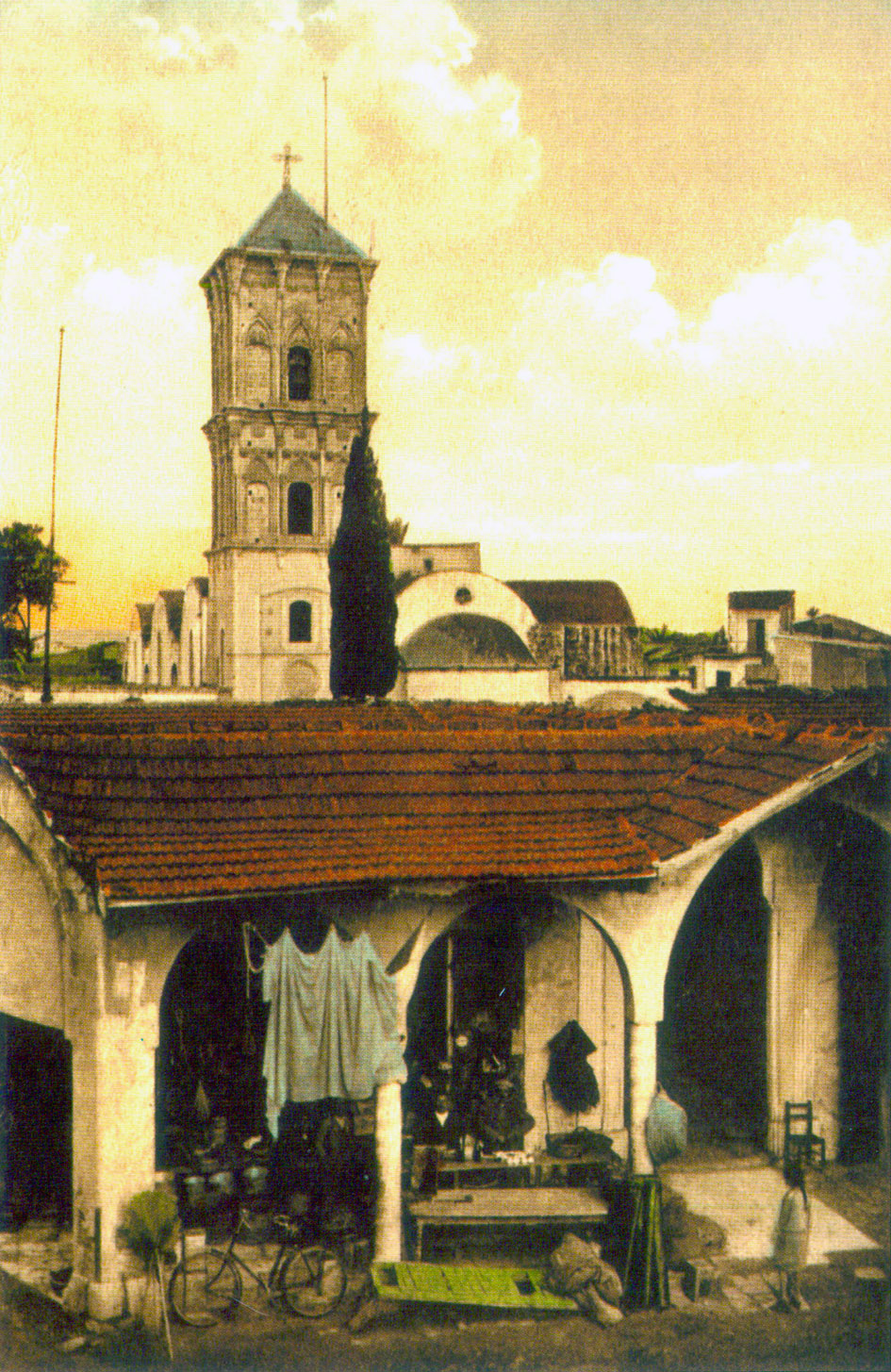
Saint Lazarus' basilica in Larnaca

After the purchase of Cyprus by Guy of Lusignan in 1192, in his attempt to establish a western-style feudal kingdom, sent emissaries to Europe, Cilicia and the Levant, resulting in a massive immigration of Armenians and other peoples. Because of their proximity, their commercial ties and a series of royal and noble marriages, the Kingdom of Cyprus and the Kingdom of Cilicia became inextricably linked. In the subsequent centuries, thousands of Cilician Armenians sought refuge in Cyprus fleeing Muslim attacks such as the siege of Antioch. Cyprus now became the easternmost bulwark of Christianity; in 1441 the authorities of Famagusta invited Armenians from Cilicia to settle there. The fall of Sis in April 1375 put an end to the Armenian Kingdom of Cilicia; its last king, Leo V, was granted safe passage to Cyprus. Although the Mamluk Sultanate had taken over Cilicia, they were unable to maintain their hold on it; Turkic tribes eventually made their way to the region and established themselves there, leading to the conquest of Cilicia by Timur. As a result, 30,000 Armenians left Cilicia in 1403 and settled in Cyprus, which continued to be ruled by the Lusignan dynasty until 1489. During the Frankish and the Venetian eras, there were Armenian churches in Nicosia, Famagusta, Spathariko. Armenians were in possession of stores and shops in the ports of Famagusta, Limassol and Paphos, as well as in the capital Nicosia, thus controlling a large segment of commerce. Additionally, Armenian was one of the eleven official languages of the Kingdom of Cyprus. According to chroniclers Leontios Makhairas, Georgios Boustronios and Florio Bustron, the Armenians of Nicosia had their own prelature and used to live in their own quarter, called Armenia or Armenoyitonia. In Famagusta, a bishopric was established in the late 12th century and Armenians lived around the Syrian quarter. Historical documents suggest the presence of an important monastic and theological centre there, at which Nerses of Lambron is said to have studied.

During the Middle Ages, Armenians in Cyprus were actively engaged in commerce, while some of them formed military garrisons in Kyrenia and elsewhere. A number of Armenians defended the Kingdom of Cyprus against the Genoese at Xeros, against the Saracens at Stylli village and against the Mamluks in Limassol and Khirokitia. By 1425, the renowned Magaravank – originally the Coptic monastery of Saint Makarios near Halevga came under Armenian possession, as did the Benedictine/Carthusian nunnery of Notre Dame de Tyre in Nicosia sometime before 1504. During the Latin era, there was also a small number of Armenian Catholics in Nicosia, Famagusta and the Bellapais Abbey, where Lord Hayton of Corycus served as a monk. The prosperity of the inhabitants of Cyprus was brought to a halt by the harsh and corrupt Venetian administration and the iniquitous taxes they imposed. Their tyrannical rule, combined with adverse conditions, caused a noticeable decline in the island's population. According to historian Stephen de Lusignan, by the late Venetian era, Armenians lived mainly in Famagusta and Nicosia and, in small numbers, at three "Armenian villages", Platani, Kornokipos and Spathariko.

=== Ottoman era (1570–1878) ===
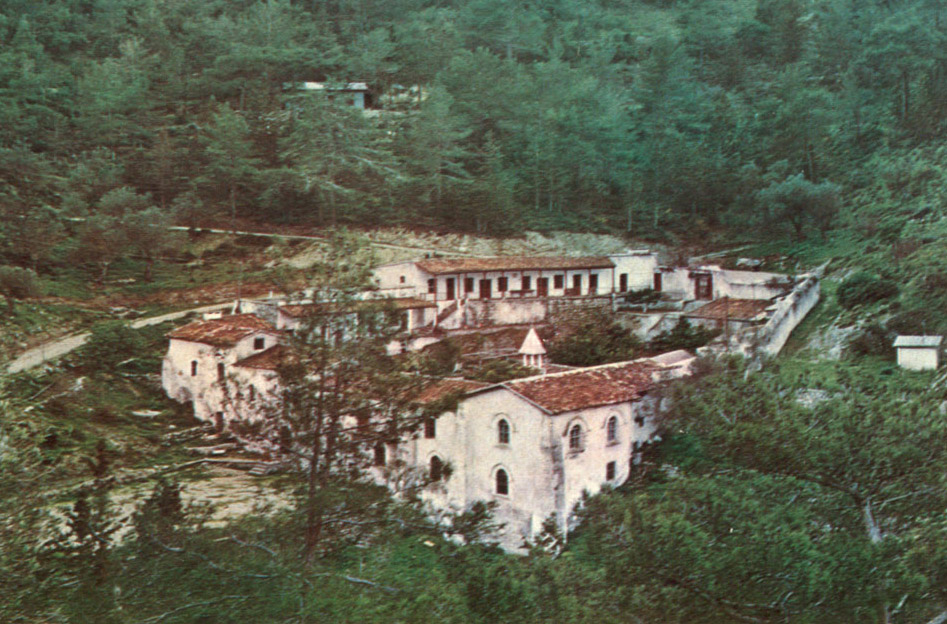
The Magaravank monastery (1967)

During the Ottoman conquest of the island, about 40,000 Ottoman-Armenian craftsmen were recruited. Many of the Ottoman Armenians who survived the conquest settled mainly in Nicosia, while the Armenian Prelature of Cyprus was recognised as an ethnarchy, through the millet institution. However, the bishopric in Famagusta was abolished, as the Christian population was killed or expelled and the entire walled city became forbidden for non-Muslims. As a reward for their services during the conquest, the Armenians of Nicosia were granted the right to guard Paphos Gate. However this privilege was only used for a short period. By a firman, they were given back the Notre Dame de Tyre church, which the Ottomans had turned into a salt store. Additionally, the Magaravank monastery had won the favour of the Ottomans and became an important way station for Armenian and other pilgrims en route to the Holy Land, as well as a place of rest for travellers and Catholicoi and other clergymen from Cilicia and Jerusalem. Contrary to the Latins and the Maronites, Armenians – being Oriental Orthodox rather than Catholic – were not persecuted because of their religion by the Ottomans. Even though about 20,000 Armenians lived in Cyprus during the very first years of the Ottoman era, by 1630 only 2,000 Armenians remained, out of a total of 56,530 inhabitants.

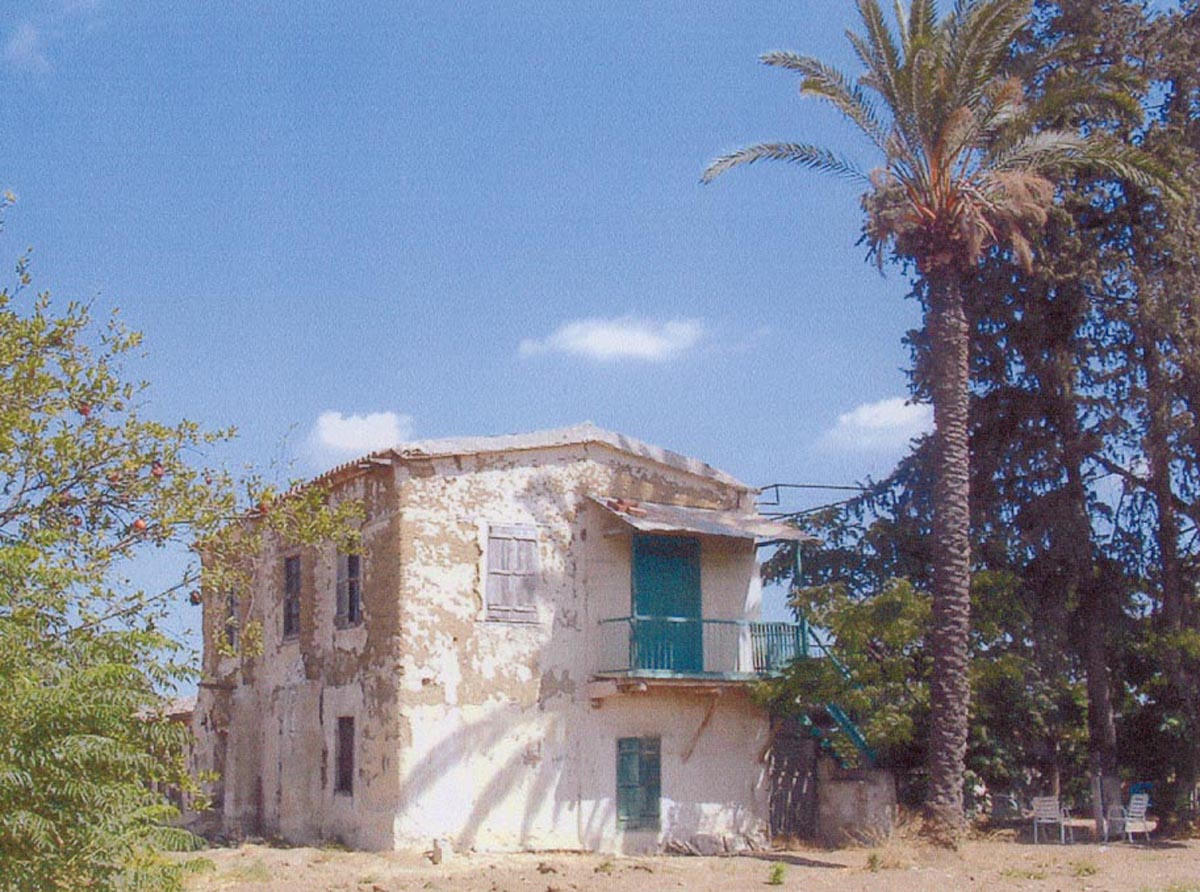
The Eramian Farm House in Pano Deftera

In the Bedesten, there were many Armenian merchants and in the late 18th century/early 19th century Nicosia's leading citizen was an Armenian trader called Sarkis, who was a beratli and was initially the dragoman for the French Consul, before becoming the dragoman for the English Consul. Gifted with the acumen of industry, Armenians practised lucrative professions and in the beginning of the 17th century Persian Armenians settled in Cyprus as silk traders, as did some affluent Ottoman-Armenians in the 18th and 19th centuries, such as Boghos-Berge Agha Eramian. However, with the new order of things, the number of Armenians and other Christians dramatically declined due to the onerous taxation and the harshness of the Ottoman administration, compelling many Christians to become Linobambaki, Crypto-Christians, which explains why former Armenian villages were inhabited by Turkish Cypriots at the end of the 19th century. A few Armenian Cypriots became Catholics through marriage with affluent Roman Catholic families.

Gradually, after the bloody events of 1821, the Ottomans destroyed the Armenian and Greek mansions, prohibited Greeks, Franks, Armenians and Maronites from carrying guns and hanged or massacred 470 notables, amongst them the Armenian parish priest of Nicosia, der Bedros, some improvements were observed during the Tanzimat period. In the spirit of the Hatt-ı Şerif of Gülhane, the Armenian Bishop, the Greek Archbishop and the Maronite Suffragan Bishop participated in the Administrative Council, which was formed in 1840. After 1850, some Armenians were employed in the civil service, while in 1860 the Notre Dame de Tyre became amongst the first in Cyprus to have a belfry. Additionally, the opening of the Suez Canal in 1869 benefited the Armenian merchants of the island, while in 1870 the first Armenian school was established in Nicosia by newly arrived Archimandrite Vartan Mamigonian. As a result of the Hatt-ı Hümayun in 1856, the administrative autonomy of the Armenian Prelature of Cyprus was officially recognised. Based on various estimates, the Armenian Cypriot community of the 19th century numbered between 150 and 250 people, the majority of whom lived in Nicosia, with smaller numbers living in Famagusta, Larnaca, and, around the Magaravank.

=== British era (1878–1960) ===
With the arrival of the British in July 1878 and their progressive administration, the small Armenian community of the island was particularly strengthened. Known for their linguistic skills, several Armenians were contracted to Cyprus to work as interpreters and public servants at the consulates and the British administration, such as Apisoghom Utidjian. The number of Armenians in Cyprus significantly increased following the massive deportations, massacres and genocide perpetrated by the Ottomans and Young Turks. Cyprus welcomed over 10,000 refugees from Cilicia, Smyrna and Constantinople, who arrived in Larnaca and all its other harbours, about 1,500 of them made the island their new home. The new arrivals had a wide array of occupations, some of whom were professionals who introduced new crafts, dishes and sweets to the island. They established associations, choirs, sports groups, Scout groups, bands, churches, schools and cemeteries throughout Cyprus. Armenians were the first locksmiths, mechanics, seat, comb and stamp makers, upholsterers, watchmakers and zincographers in Cyprus. They were the first to introduce the cinema, they significantly improved the craft of shoemaking and it was Armenians who first introduced Armenian bastourma, baklava, dried apricots, gassosa, gyros, halva, ice cubes, koubes, lahmadjoun, lokmadhes and pompes into Cypriot cuisine. Armenians also introduced two techniques of embroidery needlework: the Aintab work and the Marash work.

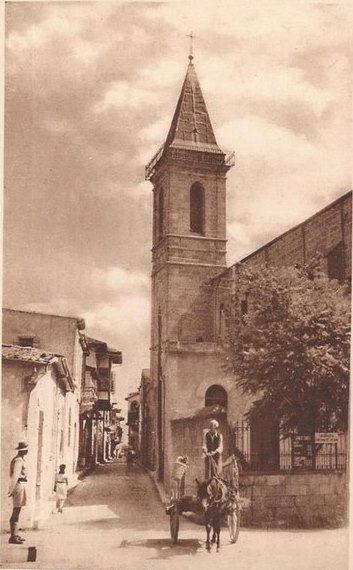
Victoria Road, Nicosia of the Armenian Quarter in the 1930s

Armenian Cypriots had a high-profile with the British administration and many became conscientious civil servants and disciplined policemen or were employed at the Cyprus Government Railway and at Cable and Wireless. Throughout the 1920s to 1950s, many worked at the asbestos mines at Amiandos and the copper mines at Mavrovouni and Skouriotissa, some of whom had been trade unionists. Some Armenian Cypriots participated in the 1897 Greco-Turkish War, the two World Wars and the EOKA struggle. The Eastern Legion was formed and trained between December 1916 and May 1918 in Monarga, near Boghazi, consisting of over 4,000 diasporan Armenian volunteers who fought against the Ottoman Empire. Some Armenian refugees arrived from Palestine and Egypt. The Armenian Cypriot community prospered throughout the British era, by establishing associations. In many ways unique for Armenian diaspora, it was built just outside Nicosia between 1924 and 1926, after the generous and benevolent donation of the Egyptian-Armenian tobacco trading brothers Krikor and Garabed Melkonian, initially to shelter and educate 500 orphans of the Armenian Genocide, who planted the trees in front of the school in memory of their murdered relatives. From an orphanage (1926–1940), it gradually became a world-renowned secondary school with a boarding section.

=== Independence era (1960–present) ===
The 1960 independence brought a new era for the Armenians of Cyprus, who – together with the Maronite and Roman Catholics – were recognised as a "religious group" by the Constitution of Cyprus and were now represented by an elected representative. The size of the community, however, had been reduced because of the emigration of about 900 Armenian Cypriots to the United Kingdom, due the Cyprus Emergency and the poor state of the local economy. A second factor that contributed to the reduction of the community's size was the emigration of about 600 Armenian Cypriots to Soviet Armenia, as part of the Pan-Armenian movement for repatriation.

During the intercommunal Cyprus crisis of 1963–1964, the Armenian Cypriot community suffered major losses, as the Armenian quarter of Nicosia fell into the Turkish Cypriot-controlled area, with buildings taken including; the prelature building, the Notre Dame de Tyre, the Melikian-Ouzounian school, the Genocide Monument, the club houses of the Armenian Club, AYMA and Armenian General Benevolent Union, as well as the Armenian Evangelical church; also taken was the Ganchvor church in Famagusta. In total, 231 Armenian Cypriot families became victims and/or lost their shops and enterprises. As a result, hundreds of Armenian Cypriots left for Great Britain, Canada, Australia and the United States. After the 1974 Turkish invasion of Cyprus, the Armenian Cypriot community suffered additional losses, several families became refugees, the Magaravank monastery in the Kyrenia Mountains was taken by the Turkish troops, the Melkonian boys dormitory was bombed by the Turkish Air Force, while the Ayios Dhometios Armenian cemetery was hit by mortars and fell within the buffer zone. In total, about 1,300 Armenian Cypriots left Cyprus in the 1960s and 1970s, in addition to those who emigrated to Soviet Armenia.

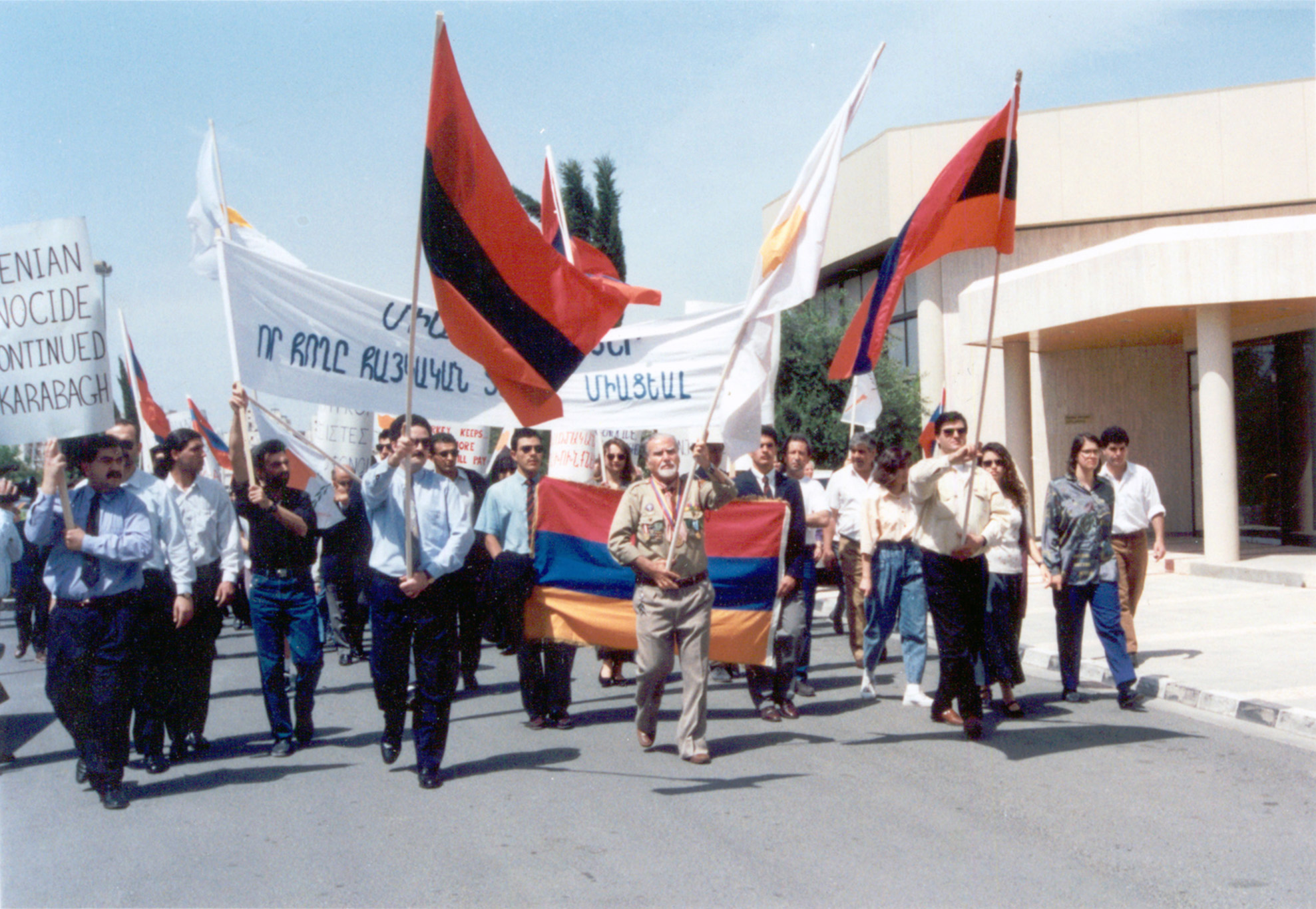
Demonstration on the Armenian genocide and Nagorno-Karabakh in 1993

With the support of the government, the small Armenian community of Cyprus gradually managed to recover from its losses and continued to prosper in the remaining urban areas. On 24 April 1975, Cyprus became the first European country to recognise the Armenian genocide with Resolution 36/1975; two more resolutions followed, Resolution 74/1982 and Resolution 103/1990, with the latter declaring 24 April as a National Remembrance Day of the Armenian genocide in Cyprus. Over the past decades, the dynamics of the Armenian Cypriot community have changed with the increased number of marriages with Greek Cypriots and other non-Armenians, and the arrival over the last 30–35 years of thousands of Armenian political and economic immigrants because of the civil war in Lebanon, the insurgencies in Syria, the Islamic revolution in Iran and the Iran–Iraq War, as well as after the Spitak earthquake and the dissolution of the Soviet Union; some of them have settled permanently in Cyprus. According to the European Charter for Regional or Minority Languages of the Council of Europe, the Armenian language – the mother tongue of the vast majority of Armenian Cypriots – was recognised as a minority language of Cyprus on 1 December 2002. Today, it is estimated that the Armenians living in Cyprus number about 3,500. There is also a small number of Armenians who came from Ethiopia, Greece, Kuwait, Turkey and the United Kingdom.

== Demography ==
There is no accurate information as to the number of Armenians living in Cyprus during the Byzantine era. Although during the early Kingdom of Cyprus there were tens of thousands of Armenians living in Cyprus (mainly in Nicosia and Famagusta – where in the latter they numbered around 1,500 in 1360), by the late Frankish era and during the Venetian era, the number of Armenians in Cyprus dwindled – for a number of reasons; the tyrannical rule of the Venetian administration, the adverse natural conditions (which affected all Cypriots), and the Hellenisation of minorities on Cyprus. The 1572 survey of population and property of Nicosia after the Ottoman conquest, recorded 90–95 local Armenians in Nicosia, out of about 1,100 inhabitants – all with completely Hellenised names.

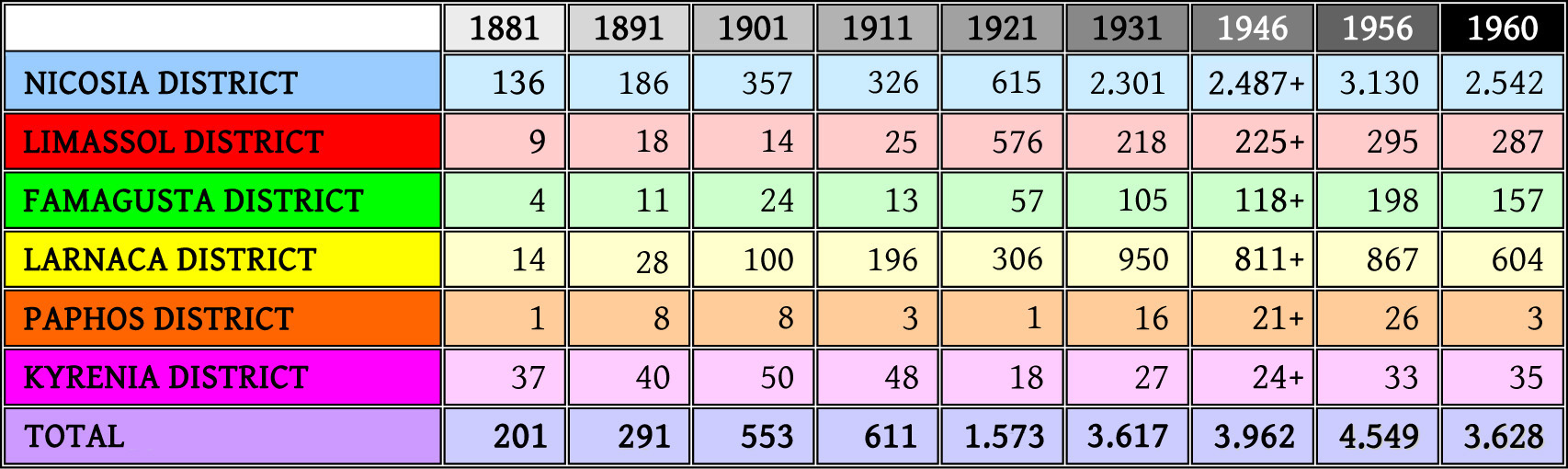
Table showing the geographical distribution of Armenian Cypriots (1881–1960)

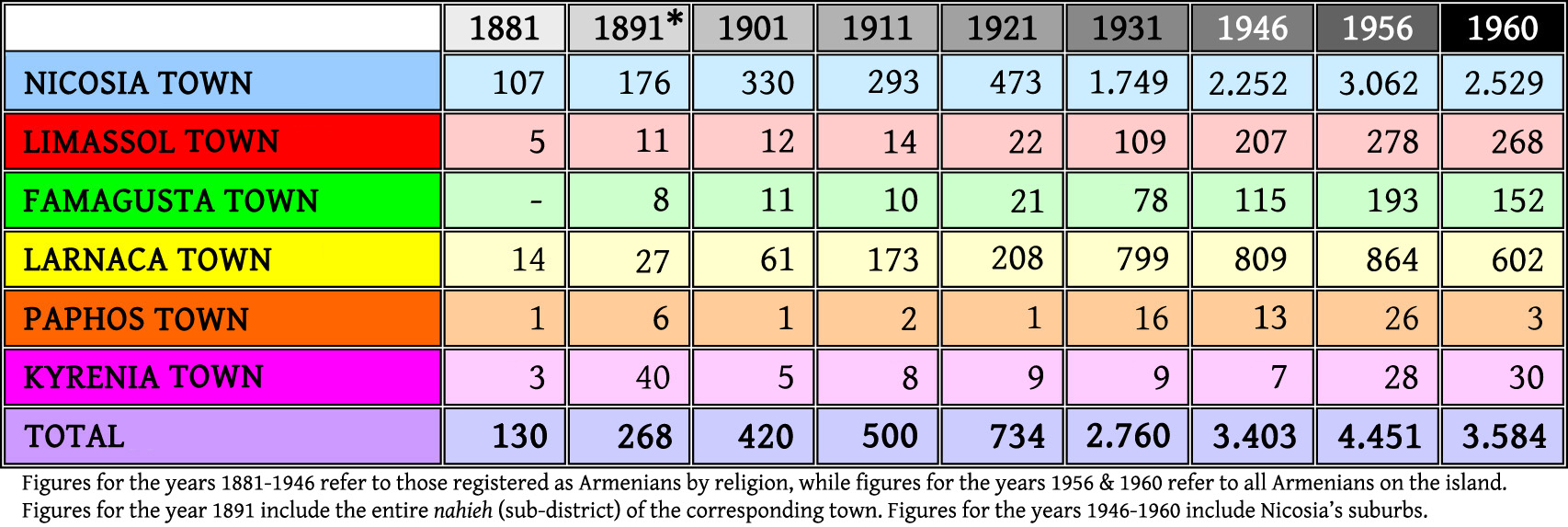
Table showing the urban distribution of Armenian Cypriots (1881–1960)

It appears that during the very first years of the Ottoman era (1570–1878), about 20,000 of the 40,000 recruited Ottoman Armenians had remained in Cyprus. Their number, however, rapidly declined, due to the oppresive nature of the regime, the onerous taxation and natural disasters. According to the Latin Bishop of Paphos, Pietro Vespa, in 1630 there were 2,000 Armenians in Cyprus (out of a total population of 56,350 – mostly living in rural areas), as many emigrated elsewhere and many others embraced Islam or they became Linobambaki. Franciscan missionary Giovanni Battista da Todi recorded 200 Armenians in Nicosia in 1647, while in 1660 he recorded over 300 Armenians on the island. Cardinal Bernardino Spada, representative of Propaganda Fide, also mentioned 200 Armenians in Nicosia in 1648, out of 3,000 inhabitants, also mentioning that their church was the largest in the capital, with 3 priests. Up until the mid-18th century, despite the limited arrival of Ottoman Armenians and Persian Armenians, their number was rather small. Russian monk Basil Barsky, who visited the island in 1727 and 1735, mentions "some Armenians" living in Nicosia. Visiting Cyprus in 1738, British traveller Richard Pococke mentions "very few Armenians, yet they have possession of an ancient church [in Nicosia]", while for the island as a whole he makes mention to "a small number of Armenians, who are very poor, though they have an archbishop and a convent in the country". However, by the time Italian Abbot Giovanni Mariti visited Cyprus in 1760 and 1767, they had apparently become "the richest section of the inhabitants [of Nicosia]", which is why he thought "there are many Armenians [on the island]". By the mid–19th century, following various waves of Hellenisation and Turkification, the number of Armenian Cypriots ranged between 150 and 200.

When the Scot John MacDonald Kinneir visited Cyprus in 1814, he estimated about 40 Armenian families in Nicosia (around 200 people) – out of a total of 2,000 families (about 10,000 people), as did British Consul Niven Kerr and Greek Vice-Consul Demetrios Margarites in 1844 and 1847, respectively. The first large-scale Ottoman census in 1831, under the supervision of Muhassil (governor) Halil Effendi, counted 114 non-Muslim males in the Armenian quarter of Nicosia and 13 at the Armenian Monastery (with a total male population of 45,365). Therefore, the number of Armenians in Cyprus would have been around 200 (out of a total of about 88,500). Visiting Cyprus in 1835, American missionary Reverend Lorenzo Warriner Pease writes "the number of Armenians [in Nicosia] is between 30 and 40 families". In 1841, about 200 Armenians lived on the island (out of a total of 108,600), of whom about 150–160 resided in Nicosia (with a population of 12,000) – according to the record of population by Muhassil Talât Effendi and the writings of French historians and travellers Louis Lacroix and Louis de Mas Latrie. The Latin Vicar General Paolo Brunoni also mentioned 200 Armenians in Nicosia in 1848, as well as some others at the Magaravank. In 1874 Belgian traveller Edmond Paridant-van der Cammen estimated 190 Armenians in Nicosia (out of a total of 13,530). Although unreliable for the Armenian population of Nicosia (mentioning only 20 families in 1875), researcher Philippos Georgiou recorded 6–8 Armenian families around the Magaravank and 5 Armenian families in Larnaca. In 1877, newly arrived priest Hovhannes Shahinian recorded 152 Armenians living in Cyprus, while the first modern population census of Nicosia, carried out in 1879 by the District Commissioner, Major-General Sir Robert Biddulph, counted 166 Armenians – out of a total of 11,197 inhabitants.

The British colonial censuses that took place between 1881 and 1956 provide fairly accurate data on the Armenian population of Cyprus. The following numbers are the combined figures of those recorded as Armenians (by religion) and those recorded as speakers of Armenian: in 1881 there were 201 Armenians in Cyprus (of whom 174 belonged to the "Armenian Church"), who increased to 291 in 1891 (of whom 269 were "Gregorians" and 11 "Armenian Catholics") and to 553 in 1901 (of whom 491 were "Gregorians" and 26 "Armenian Catholics"); the numerical increase was due to the influx of Armenian refugees from the Hamidian massacres. In 1911 there were 611 Armenians in Cyprus (of whom 549 were "Gregorians" and 9 "Armenian Catholics"), while in 1921 their number rose to 1,573 (of whom 1,197 belonged to the "Armenian Church") and to 3,617 in 1931 (of whom 3,377 were "Armenian Gregorians"), as a result of the huge wave of refugees from the Armenian genocide.

In 1935 the Armenian Prelature recorded 3,819 Armenians in Cyprus: 102 were "native Cypriots" (mainly residing in Nicosia), 399 resided at the Melkonian Educational Institute, while 3,318 were "refugees", i.e. genocide survivors and their descendants; of those, 2,139 lived in Nicosia, 678 in Larnaca, 205 in Limassol, 105 in Famagusta, 58 in Amiandos, 25 in Lefka, 20 in Kalo Khorio (Lefka), 18 in Pano Lefkara, 17 around the Magaravank, 5 in Kyrenia, 4 in Paphos and 44 in various villages. In 1946 there were 3,962 Armenians in Cyprus (of whom 3,686 were "Armenian Gregorians"), while in 1956 they numbered 4,549.

The last accurate census of the population of Cyprus with regard to its ethnic breakdown was carried out in 1960; it recorded 3,628 Armenians in Cyprus (of whom 3,378 were "Armenian Gregorians"). In 1978 and 1987 the Armenian Prelature recorded the Armenian population of Cyprus, which was 1,787 and 2,742, respectively (however, without extra information regarding their geographical distribution).

Since then, their number has increased; currently, about 3,500 Armenians live in Cyprus: 65% live in the capital, Nicosia, 20% in Larnaca, 10% in Limassol and 5% in Paphos and some villages. Over 95% of the Armenian population of Cyprus speak Armenian and are Armenian Orthodox; some 5% belong either to the Armenian Evangelical Church, Armenian Catholic Church, Latin Church, Greek Orthodox Church, Anglican Church Plymouth Brethren Church, Seventh-day Adventist Church or are Jehovah's Witnesses. About 1,000 out of the 3,500 Armenians who live in Cyprus are from Armenia, Lebanon, Syria, Russia, Georgia, Persia, Greece, Iraq, Ethiopia, Turkey and Kuwait. Most of the first wave of Armenians from Armenia who arrived in Cyprus from 1988 onwards were in fact the Armenian Cypriots and their descendants who emigrated to Armenia between 1962 and 1964, as part of Pan-Armenian movement.

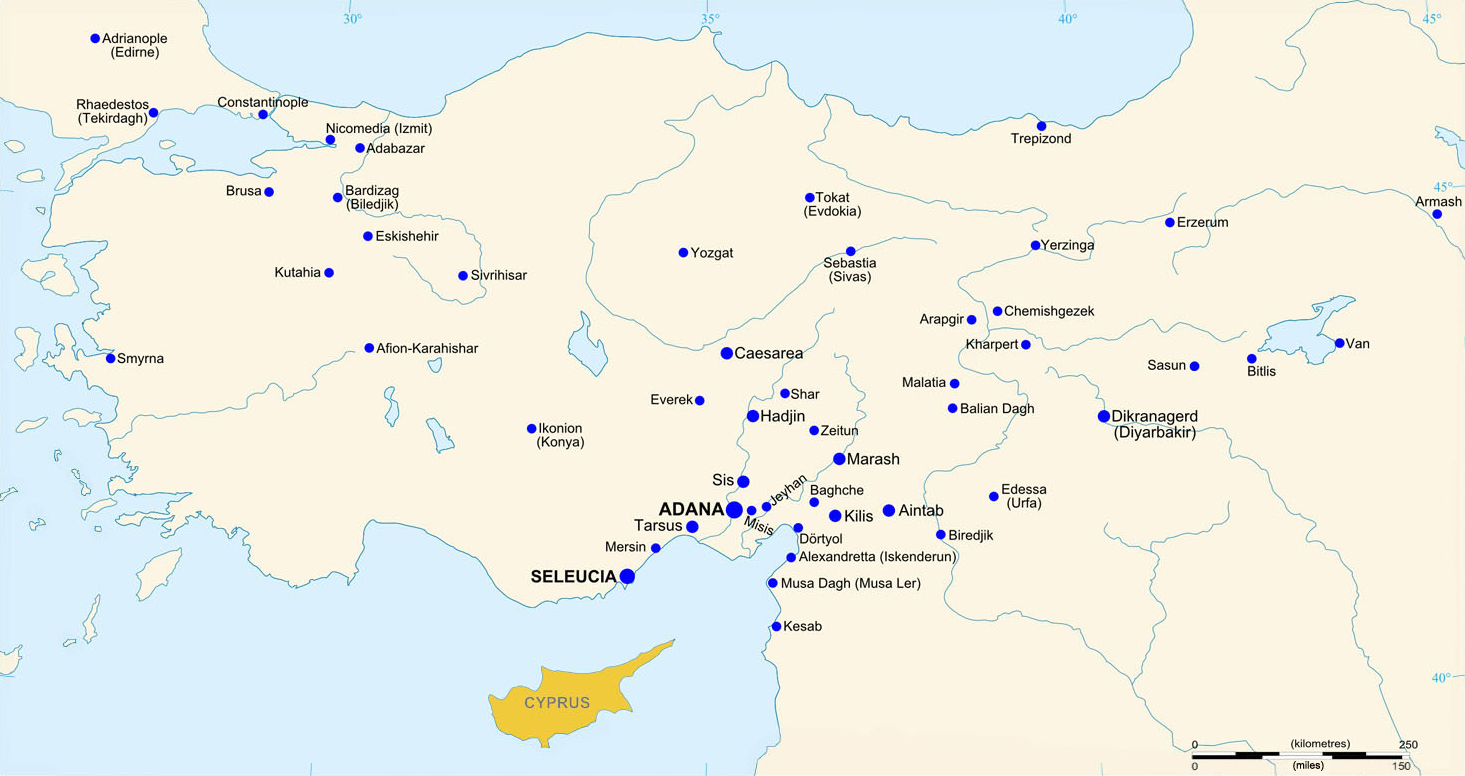
Places of origin of Armenian Cypriots, according to information collected by Archbishop Bedros Saradjian in 1935

Of the about 1,000 refugees from the Hamidian massacres (1894–1896) mainly originated from Diyarbakir (Dikranagerd), Aintab and Kilis; only about 100 of them stayed. The next wave of Armenian refugees were the about 2,000 who fled the Adana massacre in 1909, most of whom returned to their ancestral homes in Adana within the same year. However, the largest wave of Armenian refugees – some of whom had come before and returned – were the nearly 9,000 who escaped the massive deportations, massacres and the genocide perpetrated by the Ottomans and the Young Turks. About 1,300 of them decided to stay, while the others eventually made arrangements to settle in other countries. Those refugees came mainly from Adana and Seleucia (Silifke), while there a significant number of them came from Sis, Marash, Tarsus, Caesarea, Hadjin and Aintab; smaller numbers came from other places, alphabetically: Adapazar, Adrianople (Edirne), Afion-Karahisar, Alexandretta (Iskenderoun), Arapgir, Armash, Baghche, Bardizag, Balian Dagh, Biredjik, Bitlis, Brusa, Chemishgezek, Constantinople (Istanbul), Dörtyol, Edessa (Urfa), Erzerum, Eskishehir, Everek, Ikonion (Konya), Jeyhan, Kesab, Kharpert, Kutahia, Malatia, Mersin, Misis, Musa Dagh (Musa Ler), Nicomedia (Izmit), Rhaedestos (Tekirdagh), Sasun, Sebastia (Sivas), Shar, Sivri Hisar, Smyrna (İzmir), Tokat (Evdokia), Trepizond, Van, Yerzinga, Yozgat and Zeitun.

== Politics ==
=== Local administration ===
Armenian participation in local administration has been limited. Traditionally, there is the appointed mukhtar of Nicosia's Karaman Zade quarter (the Armenian Quarter). To date, there have been 4 mukhtars: Melik Melikian (1927–1949), Kasbar Delyfer (1949–1956), Vahe Kouyoumdjian (1956–2009) and Mgo Kouyoumdjian (2011–present). Bedros Amirayan served as an appointed member of Famagusta's municipal committee (1903–1905), Antranik L. Ashdjian served as an appointed municipal councillor and, later on, Vice Mayor for Nicosia (1964–1970), while Berge Kevorkian served as an appointed municipal councillor for Nicosia (1970–1986).

=== Cypriot politics ===
With the exception of the elected representatives, there has been only one Armenian Cypriot MP in the House of Representatives, Marios Garoyian. He was elected as an MP for Nicosia District on 21 May 2006 with the Democratic Party and in October 2006 he became the party's president. After the election of Demetris Christofias as President of Cyprus in February 2008, Marios Garoyian was voted Speaker of the House of Representatives on 6 March 2008, the second highest political position in Cyprus. He was re-elected as an MP for Nicosia District on 22 May 2011 and served as House Speaker until 2 June 2011.

=== Armenian politics ===
Despite its relatively small size, the Armenian Cypriot community has been an active participant in Pan-Armenian politics since the late 19th century, which became more established in the mid-20th century. All three major Armenian Diaspora parties are active in Cyprus, especially the Armenian Revolutionary Federation (ARF). It established its presence in Cyprus as early as 1897 and it continued to be present on and off on the island until the early years of the 20th century. At that time, Cyprus was frequently used as a stepping stone for some European Armenian fedayi who had Asia Minor and Cilicia as their final destination. However, after the Armenian genocide, the party presence became minimal, save for individual members, supporters and/or sympathisers, until it was re-organised after World War II and was officially re-established in 1947; its chapter is called "Karenian", after Armen Karo, who briefly visited Cyprus, to organise the assembly of weapons for the Zeitun rebellion.

The ARF is affiliated with the Armenian Young Men's Association (AYMA) in Nicosia, the Armenian Club in Larnaca and the Limassol Armenian Young Men's Association in Limassol, as well as with the Armenian National Committee of Cyprus, the Armenian Youth Federation of Cyprus, the "Azadamard" Armenian Youth Centre, the Armenian Relief Society of Cyprus and the Hamazkayin Armenian Educational and Cultural Association of Cyprus, all based in Nicosia. The Armenian Relief Society chapter of Cyprus is called "Sosse", after Sosse Mayrig, who visited Cyprus in the summer of 1938, while the Hamazkayin chapter of Cyprus is called "Oshagan", after Hagop Oshagan, who had been a professor at the Melkonian Educational Institute between 1926 and 1934.

The Ramgavar party (ADL) first appeared in Cyprus in the early 1930s, in the form of a core of party members. It also participated in the Diocesan Council elections of 1947, which caused a large stir in community life. However, the party has officially been active in Cyprus since 1956. Its chapter is called Tekeyan, after Vahan Tekeyan, who had been a professor at the Melkonian Educational Institute in 1934 and 1935. The party has never been very active on the island, mainly because it was overshadowed by the significant presence of the Armenian General Benevolent Union (AGBU), which is affiliated with ADL. Both organisations lost a substantial number of followers, when they "repatriated" to Armenia between 1962 and 1964, as part of the nerkaght (ներգաղթ – repatriation) movement and when they realized that what was promised was not real.

The youngest Armenian political party in Cyprus is the Social Democrat Hunchakian Party (SDHP), which was set up on the island in 2005, following the split within AGBU, which was brought about by the decision to close the Melkonian Educational Institute. As Cyprus was frequently used as a stepping stone for some European Armenian fedayi who had Asia Minor and Cilicia as their final destination during the late 19th century and the early 20th century, a small number of the party's members temporarily stayed on the island during those times. The SDHP is affiliated with the Nor Serount Cultural Association in Nicosia.

The Armenian Cypriot community has been actively engaged in Pan-Armenian issues, such as the organisation of demonstrations and other forms of protest on matters that pertain to all Armenians. Other than promoting awareness and recognition of the Armenian genocide, the Armenian Cypriot community lobbied in favour of the Nagorno-Karabakh Republic. During the last decade, the Armenian Cypriot community was actively involved in the movement to raise awareness on the unilateral closure of the Melkonian Educational Institute by AGBU (2004–2005), the Armenia-Turkey protocols and the extradition of Ramil Safarov to Azerbaijan (2012), as well as in events commemorating Hrant Dink's memory, organised every year since his murder in 2007.

In recent years the Armenian Cypriot community has been providing financial and humanitarian aid to Armenians in need around the world. It has provided assistance to earthquake-stricken Armenians in Armenia, after the 1988 earthquake, to orphans in Nagorno-Karabakh, to Armenians in Lebanon, Armenians in Greece and Armenians in Syria, as well as to Armenians in Armenia and Nagorno-Karabakh, through the "Hayastan" All-Armenian Fund.

=== Armenian genocide recognition ===
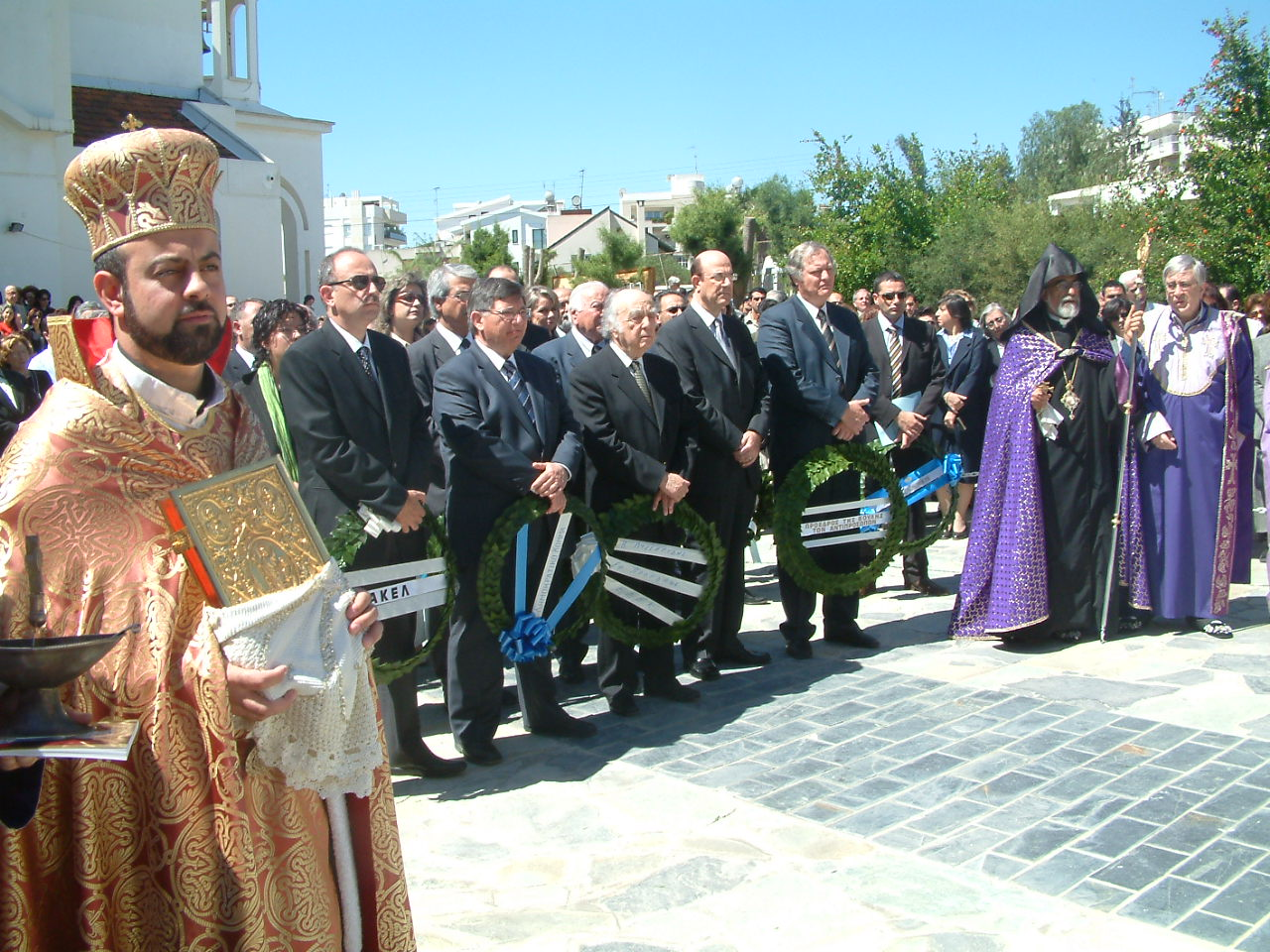
Armenian Genocide memorial service with the participation of Greek Cypriot politicians (2008)

Most Cypriots are aware of the Armenian genocide and are supportive and sympathetic towards Armenians. Armenian genocide refugees who remained in Cyprus were in the unique position of escaping from Ottoman Turks and living amicably amongst Turkish Cypriots.

On 25 January 1965 the Foreign Minister of Cyprus, Spyros Kyprianou first raised the issue of recognition of the Armenian genocide to the General Assembly of the United Nations. Prior to his speech, a delegation comprising ARF Bureau members Papken Papazian and Berj Missirlian, as well as Armenian National Committee of Cyprus members Anania Mahdessian and Vartkes Sinanian, handed him a memorandum urging Cyprus's support in raising the issue at the United Nations.

Cyprus was the first European country (and the second world-wide, after Uruguay) to officially recognise the genocide. On 24 April 1975, after the efforts and submission by Representative Antranik L. Ashdjian, Resolution 36 was voted unanimously by the House of Representatives. Representative Aram Kalaydjian was instrumental in passing unanimously through the House of Representatives two more resolutions regarding the Armenian genocide: Resolution 74/29–04–1982, submitted by the Foreign Relations' Parliamentary Committee, and Resolution 103/19–04–1990, submitted by all parliamentary parties. Resolution 103 declared 24 April as a National Remembrance Day of the Armenian genocide in Cyprus.

Since 1965, when Cypriot government officials started participating in the annual Armenian Genocide functions, Cyprus's political leaders are often keynote speakers in those functions organised to commemorate the Armenian genocide. Over the last years, there is usually a march starting from the centre of Nicosia and ending at the Virgin Mary church in Strovolos, where a commemorative event takes place in front of the Armenian Genocide Monument; other events also take place, such as blood donations.

== Social life ==
The Armenian Cypriot community has traditionally had an active and structured social life. Various charity, cultural, educational and social events are organised, such as fund-raisers/bazaars, art/book exhibitions, dancing/theatre performances, balls, lunches, film screenings, camps/excursions in Cyprus and abroad (panagoum), as well as lectures and commemoration ceremonies regarding Armenia, Nagorno-Karabakh, the Armenian diaspora and the Armenian genocide.

The main venue for community events is the AYMA club and the "Vahram Utidjian" Hall, at the basement of the Armenian Prelature building, both in Strovolos, Nicosia. In the past, numerous events were organised at the Melkonian Educational Institute in Aglandjia, the hall of the Armenian Club in Nicosia or the hall of the old AGBU club in Nicosia. School events take place at the open amphitheatre or the newly built auditorium of Nicosia's Nareg Armenian School. More recently, some community events have been organised at the Larnaca Armenian Club or Limassol's Armenian church hall.

=== Notable organisations ===
- Armenian Young Men's Association (AYMA) - Established by a group of young Armenian men in Nicosia in October 1934, it is the leading Armenian Cypriot club and the centre of the social, sports and cultural life of the Armenian Cypriot community. After it was housed in various rented places, it acquired its own club house in 1961 on Tanzimat street, purchased for £6,000. As the club house was taken over during the 1963–1964 intercommunal violence, AYMA fell in the Turkish Cypriot-controlled area, as was the rest of the historical Armenian Quarter of Nicosia. It was then housed in various rented places. Its own premises, built through 1985 and 1986, are located at the corner of Alasia and Valtetsi streets, near the Virgin Mary church in Strovolos, Nicosia, on land leased by the government (Decision of the Council of Ministers 21.188/17–12–1981), and were inaugurated on 30 May 1987 by President Spyros Kyprianou. There is a well-organised library room at the club house. Its renovated and expanded functions hall was inaugurated on 28 February 2010 by Representative Vartkes Mahdessian. AYMA is affiliated with the Homenetmen Pan-Armenian organisation.
- Armenian Youth Federation of Cyprus - Edifies children, teenagers and young adults.
- Armenian Relief Society of Cyprus – A women's charity organization, which sends help to Armenia, Nagorno-Karabakh, the Armenian diaspora and local charity organisations.
- Hamazkayin of Cyprus - Organizes various cultural events, such as dance and theatre performances, art exhibitions and lectures.

== Legal status and representation ==
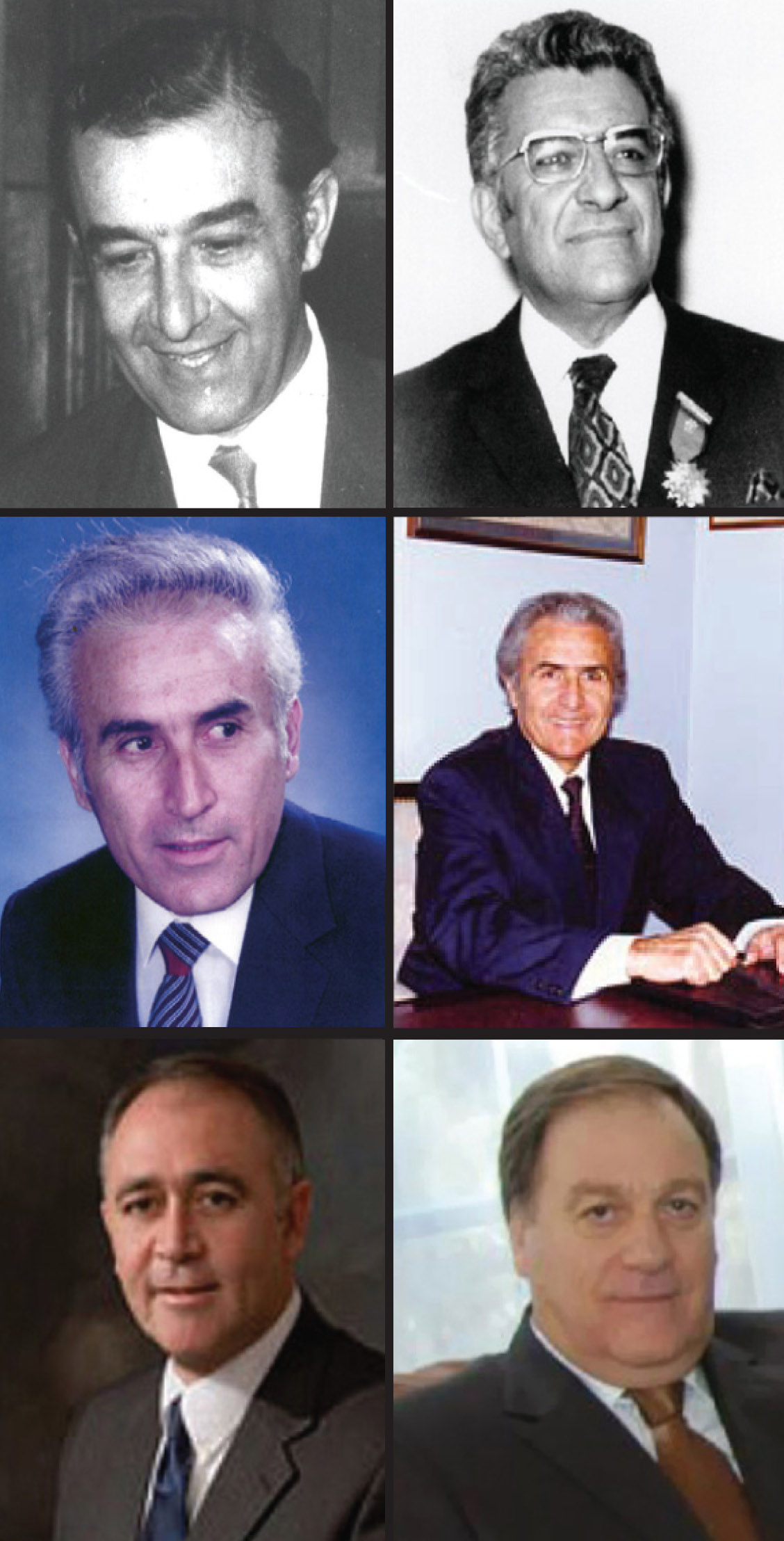
The Armenian Representatives, 1960–2013

With the Independence of Cyprus, on 16 August 1960, under Article 2 § 3 of the Constitution, Armenians, and Catholics (both Marionite and Roman Catholic) were recognised as "religious groups". In the referendum held on 13 November 1960, all three religious groups opted to belong to the co-religious Greek Cypriot community, something which consequently defined their political options in the inter-communal controversy and somewhat affected their relations with the Turkish Cypriots, who in turn viewed them as an extension of Greek Cypriot political choices. This is why the religious groups were affected similarly during the 1963–1964 inter-communal troubles and the Turkish invasion of Cyprus in 1974.

Article 110 § 3 recognises the administrative autonomy of the religious groups' churches, as it was established with the Hatt-ı Hümayun in 1856. According to Article 111, the three churches retain their powers regarding matters of personal status. Law 95/1989 transferred the jurisdiction of the ecclesiastical courts to the family courts, the configuration of which was defined by Law 87(I)/1994; of the three religious groups, only the Armenians participate in their workings.

In accordance with the provisions of Article 109 of the Constitution, Armenian Cypriots were given political representation: as a result of their choice to belong to the Greek Cypriot community, an Armenian and a Latin participated in the Nicosia members of the Greek Communal Chamber, while a Maronite participated in the Kyrenia members (Colonial Law 36/1959, Colonial Law 6/1960 and Greek Communal Chamber Law 8/1960). The two Communal Chambers, which acted as a Lower Parliament, had jurisdiction over all religious, educational, cultural and other affairs of communal nature (Article 87).

With the end of Turkish Cypriot representation in the common state in 1963 and the self-dissolution of the Greek Communal Chamber in 1965, it was decided to transfer the executive powers of the Greek Communal Chamber to the newly-formed Ministry of Education and its legislative powers to the House of Representatives (Law 12/1965). According to the Decision of the Council of Ministers 4.907/29–07–1965, it was decided that the three representatives would provisionally continue to represent their communities in the house on issues pertaining to the jurisdiction of their chamber and that the house was to request their opinion before legislating on pertinent matters (Law 12/1965). To approximate the tenure of the other MPs, the term of the three representatives was annually extended (Law 45/1965, Law 49/1966, Law 50/1967, Law 87/1968 and Law 58/1969). The status of the three representatives in the House of Representatives was confirmed with Law 58/1970 and furthermore specified with Law 38/1976, Law 41/1981 and Law 66(I)/2011. Since 1991, the elections for the three representatives are held simultaneously and in parallel with the general parliamentary elections and the representatives' term is identical with that of the proper MPs (Law 70/1986).

The representatives act as liaisons between their communities and the state and they are par excellence competent to bring before the state all issues relating to their group. Their participation has a 5-year duration and a consultative character, as although they can express their views on matters relating to their group, they do not have the right to vote. The representative delivers a speech on the Armenian genocide during the plenary session of the house convened on or near 24 April each year. So far, six Armenian representatives have served: Berge Tilbian from Nicosia (1960–1970), Antranik L. Ashdjian from Nicosia (1970–1982), Aram Kalaydjian from Larnaca (1982–1995), Bedros Kalaydjian from Larnaca (1995–2005), Vahakn Atamyan from Nicosia (2005–2006) and Vartkes Mahdessian from Nicosia (2006–present).

The representatives enjoy the same privileges as other MPs (non-liability, immunity, financial compensation, tax exemptions, etc.), they attend the plenary sessions of parliament, they participate in the Parliamentary Committee on Education and (since 1970) in the Advisory Committee on Private Education of the Ministry of Education, Sport and Youth, whereas since 1999 they appoint the relevant members of the House of Elders. Additionally, the Armenian and Maronite representatives consult with the Minister of Education, Sport and Youth regarding the latter's recommendation to the Council of Ministers about the appointment of the Armenian Schools' Committee and the Maronite Schools' Committee [Law 103(I)/1999].

Since 1998, the elected representative is ex officio member of the Diocesan Council (Թեմական Ժողով) of the Armenian Ethnarchy (Ազգային Իշխանութիւն).

== Elections ==
The first elections for the Armenian member of the Greek Communal Chamber took place on 5 August 1960 between Vahram Levonian and Berge Tilbian, who was elected after receiving 60.49% (1,364 votes). Between 1965 and 1970, the term of office for the Armenian, the Maronite and the Latin representatives was extended by special laws, until Law 58/1970 was enacted, properly including them in the House of Representatives.

The current Armenian representative is Vartkes Mahdessian, having been elected in 2006, 2011, 2016 and 2021.

Elections for the Armenian representative
Date	Winner	Votes	Percentage	Opposition	Notes
5 August 1960	Berge Tilbian	1,364	60.49%	Vahram Levonian	
19 July 1970	Antranik L. Ashdjian	590	56.30%	Berge Tilbian	
3 October 1976	Antranik L. Ashdjian	612	50.96%	Aram Kalaydjian	
14 March 1982	Aram Kalaydjian	771	58.36%	Antranik L. Ashdjian	
13 July 1986	Aram Kalaydjian	792	65.08%	Anna Ashdjian	
19 May 1991	Aram Kalaydjian	875	67.00%	Anna Ashdjian	
22 October 1995	Bedros Kalaydjian	849	60.34%	Kevork Mahdessian	By-election due to Aram Kalaydjian's death on 10 September 1995
26 May 1996	Bedros Kalaydjian	997	73.91%	Anna Ashdjian	
27 May 2001	Bedros Kalaydjian	857	57.13%	Garabed Khatcho-Kazandjian	
9 October 2005	Vahakn Atamyan	769	52.03%	Antranik Ashdjian (43.91%) Parsegh Zartarian (4.12%)	By-election due to Bedros Kalaydjian death on 1 September 2005
21 May 2006	Vartkes Mahdessian	899	52.60%	Vahakn Atamyan	
22 May 2011	Vartkes Mahdessian	1,105	67.67%	Antranik A. Ashdjian	
2016	Vartkes Mahdessian	N/A	N/A	N/A	Unopposed
2021	Vartkes Mahdessian	N/A	N/A	N/A	Unopposed

The Armenians in Nicosia also have a mukhtar, appointed by the Ministry of Interior. The first mukhtar was Melik Melikian (1927–1949), succeeded by Kasbar Delyfer (1949–1956) and Vahe Kouyoumdjian (1956–2009). As of 1 January 2011, the current Armenian mukhtar is Mgo Kouyoumdjian. As of 2025 the mukhtar of the Ayios Demetris quarter in Strovolos is Sarkis Eojourian.

== Religion ==
Like most communities of the Armenian Diaspora, the Armenian Cypriot community is predominantly Armenian Apostolic (about 95%). Some 5% belong either to the Armenian Evangelical Church, Armenian Catholic Church, Roman Catholic Church, Greek Orthodox Church, Anglican Church, Plymouth Brethren Church, Seventh-day Adventist Church or are Jehovah's Witnesses; of this 5%, historically the most significant groups have been Armenian Evangelicals, who in the 1940s and 1950s comprised about 10% of the Armenian Cypriot community, and Armenian-Catholics, who have been on the island since the time of the Crusades.

=== Armenian Prelature of Cyprus ===
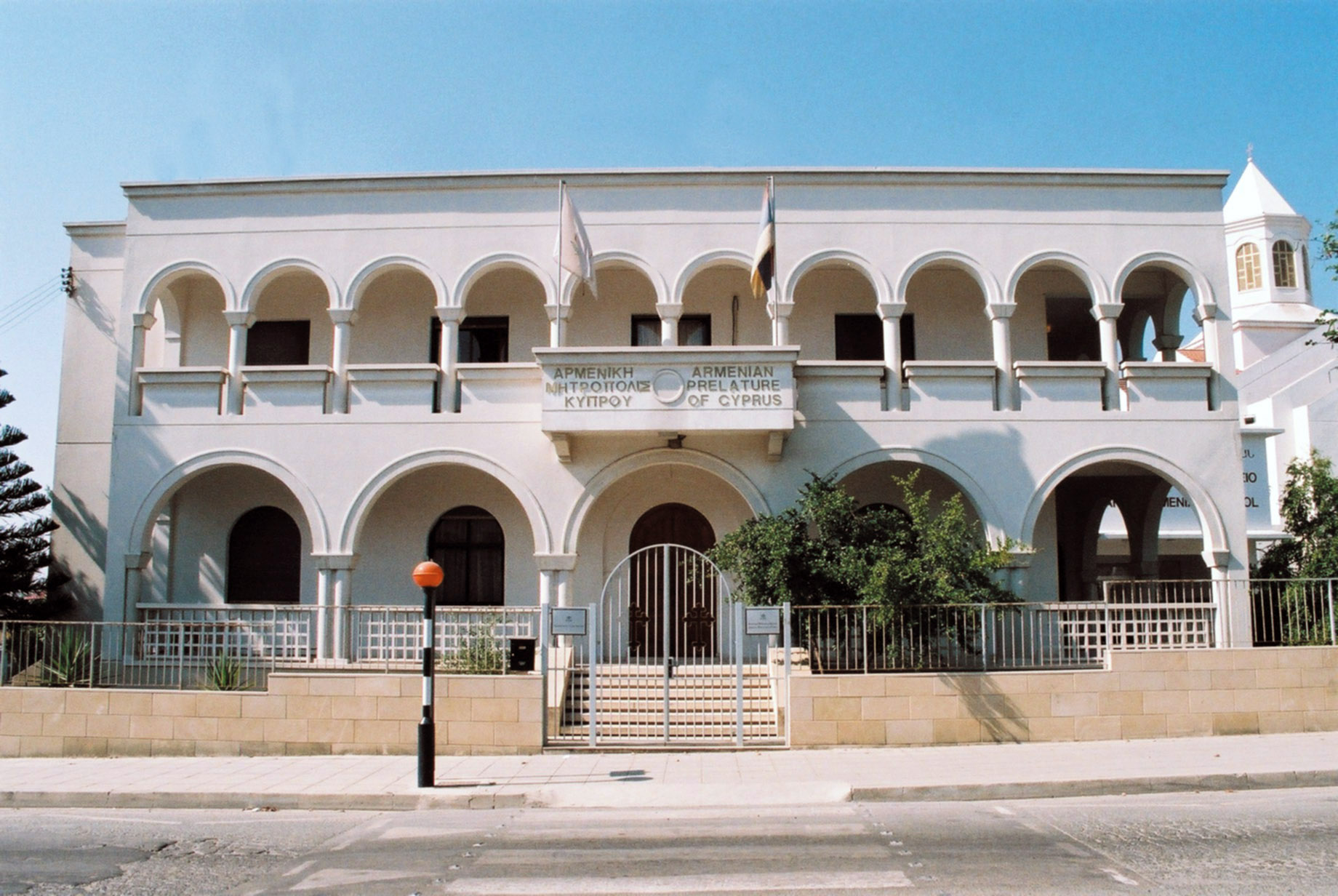
The building of the Armenian Prelature of Cyprus in Strovolos, Nicosia

The Armenian Prelature of Cyprus was established in 973 by Catholicos Khatchig I. Historically, the prelature has been under the jurisdiction of the Catholicosate of the Great House of Cilicia, while today it is the oldest theme under its jurisdiction. Since 2024 the Catholicosal Vicar has been Archbishop Gomidas Ohanian. The parish priest in Nicosia is Archpriest Momik Habeshian (since 2000), the parish priest in Larnaca is Archpriest Mashdots Ashkarian (since 1992), whereas the spiritual shepherd in Limassol is Senior Archimandrite Hovhannes Saghdejian (since 2024).

For centuries, the prelature building was located within the Armenian compound on Victoria street in walled Nicosia; when that area was taken over by Turkish Cypriot extremists in 1963–1964, the prelature was temporarily housed in Aram Ouzounian street and, later on, in Kyriakos Matsis street in Ayios Dhometios. Due to the efforts of Bishop Zareh Aznavorian and with financial aid from the Evangelical Church of Westphalia, the new prelature building was erected through 1983 and 1984, next to the Sourp Asdvadzadzin cathedral and the Nicosia Nareg school; it was officially inaugurated on 4 March 1984, during the pastoral visit of Catholicos Karekin II. By initiative of Bishop Varoujan Hergelian, in 1998 the basement of the building was renovated and the "Vahram Utidjian" Hall was formed; previously a store room, its creation was funded from the proceeds of the 1994 auction of the art collection that Vahram Utidjian had donated to the prelature in 1954. It was inaugurated on 3 February 1999 by Catholicos Aram I; numerous charity, communal and cultural events take place there. The Prelature's consistory houses a collection of ecclesiastical relics, some of which were previously in the Notre Dame de Tyre church or the Magaravank.

=== Armenian Evangelical Church ===
The first Armenian Evangelicals in Cyprus came after the arrival of the British in July 1878. As they were not committed, and very few, they quickly became associated with the Armenian Apostolic Church. With the influx of more Protestants, Armenian Evangelicals became affiliated with the Reformed Presbyterian Church as early as 1887. In 1933, the newly formed Cyprus Synod of the Reformed Presbyterian Church divided its congregations into Armenian and Greek councils. Armenian Evangelicals were granted provisional autonomy from the Reformed Presbyterian Mission in 1954, which was formalised in 1962. In Larnaca, Armenian Evangelicals dwindled after the inter-communal troubles of 1963–1964, services were no longer held; in Nicosia, the Armenian Evangelical church came under Turkish Cypriot control during the inter-communal violence and so services were then held at the American Academy chapel until 1973. After nearly 30 years of inactivity, by initiative of Nouvart Kassouni-Panayiotides and Lydia Gulesserian and with the help of Hrayr Jebejian, Executive Secretary of the Bible Society in the Gulf Armenian Evangelicals were re-organised at the Greek Evangelical church in Larnaca in 2002. Since 2005, when Hrayr Jebejian moved to Cyprus, services are held every few months at the Greek Evangelical church in Nicosia. The Armenian Evangelical Church organizes a few lectures in Nicosia.

=== Armenian Catholic Church ===
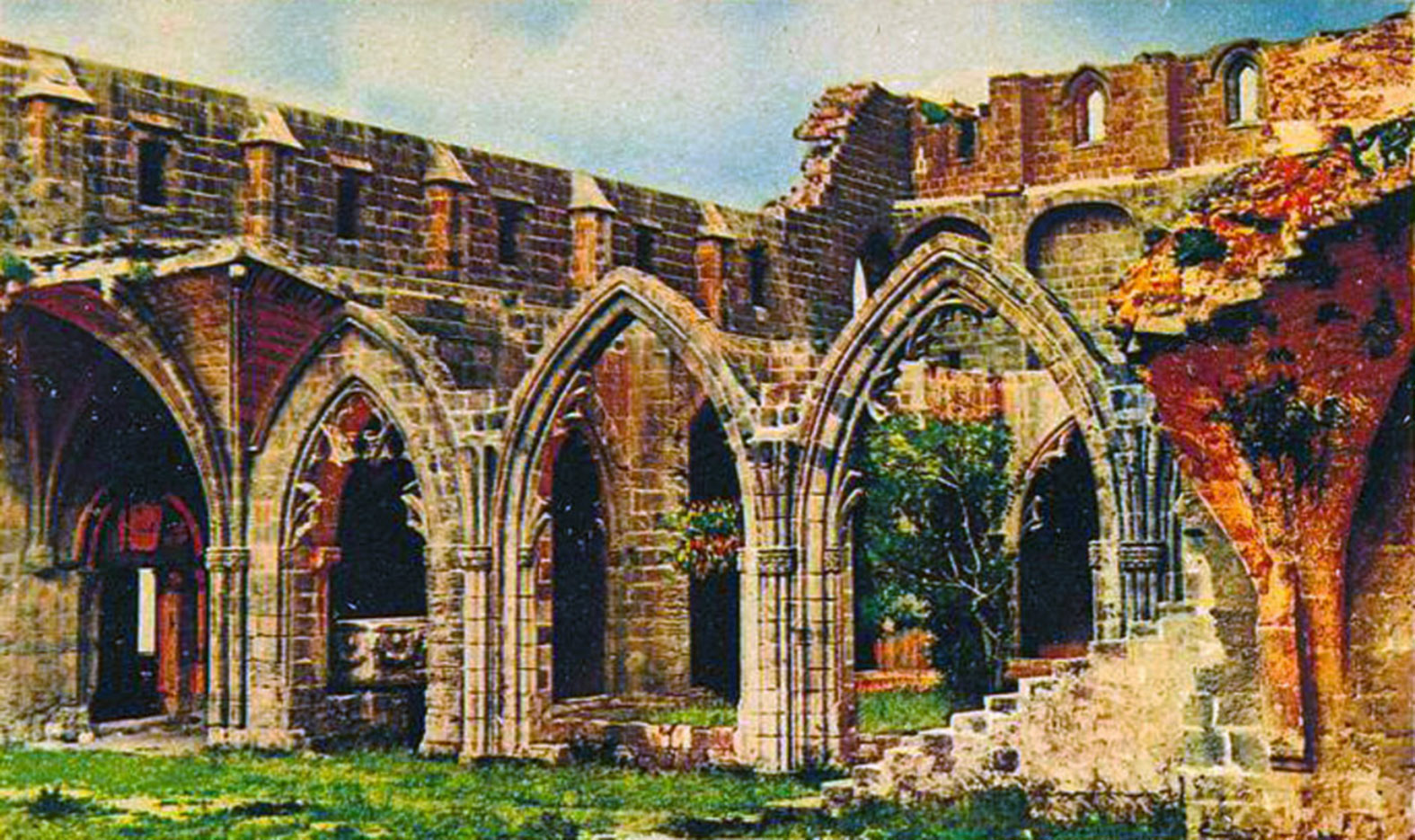
The Bellapais Abbey (early 20th century)

Armenian Catholics first came to the island during the Frankish era from the nearby Armenian Kingdom of Cilicia. It is unclear whether they had their own structure during the Latin era or if they were under the Latin Church of Cyprus, as has been the case since the Ottoman era. During the Ottoman era, there was a very limited conversion of Armenian Orthodox to Catholicism, mainly due to the proselytising activities of the Franciscan mission in Nicosia and Larnaca, especially during the 17th and 18th centuries; however, these must have been temporary apostasies and their number never exceeded 50 at any given time. In 1794 the small Armenian Catholic community of Larnaca was granted some holy chalices from the auction of the belongings of the old Capuchin monastery of the town. During the British era the Armenian Catholic community increased in number, due to the arrival of a large number of refugees from the Armenian genocide. In 1931, there were about 200 Armenian Catholics in Cyprus most of them became attached to the Latin places of worship, especially the Holy Cross cathedral in Nicosia and Saint Joseph's convent in Larnaca; between 1921 and 1923, the latter housed a small Armenian Catholic school, run by Abbot Jean Kouyoumdjian – who served at the convent between 1921 and 1928. In 1960, there were less than 100 Armenian Catholics. However, their number decreased in the following years, due to emigration to other countries and assimilation with the Armenian Cypriot, the Latin-Cypriot and/or the Greek Cypriot community. However, due to the influx of Lebanese-Armenians to Cyprus since the mid-1970s, there has been a small increase in the number of Armenian Catholics on the island. Currently, there are less than 20 local Armenian Catholics, in addition to about 30 foreign Armenians.

== Places of worship ==
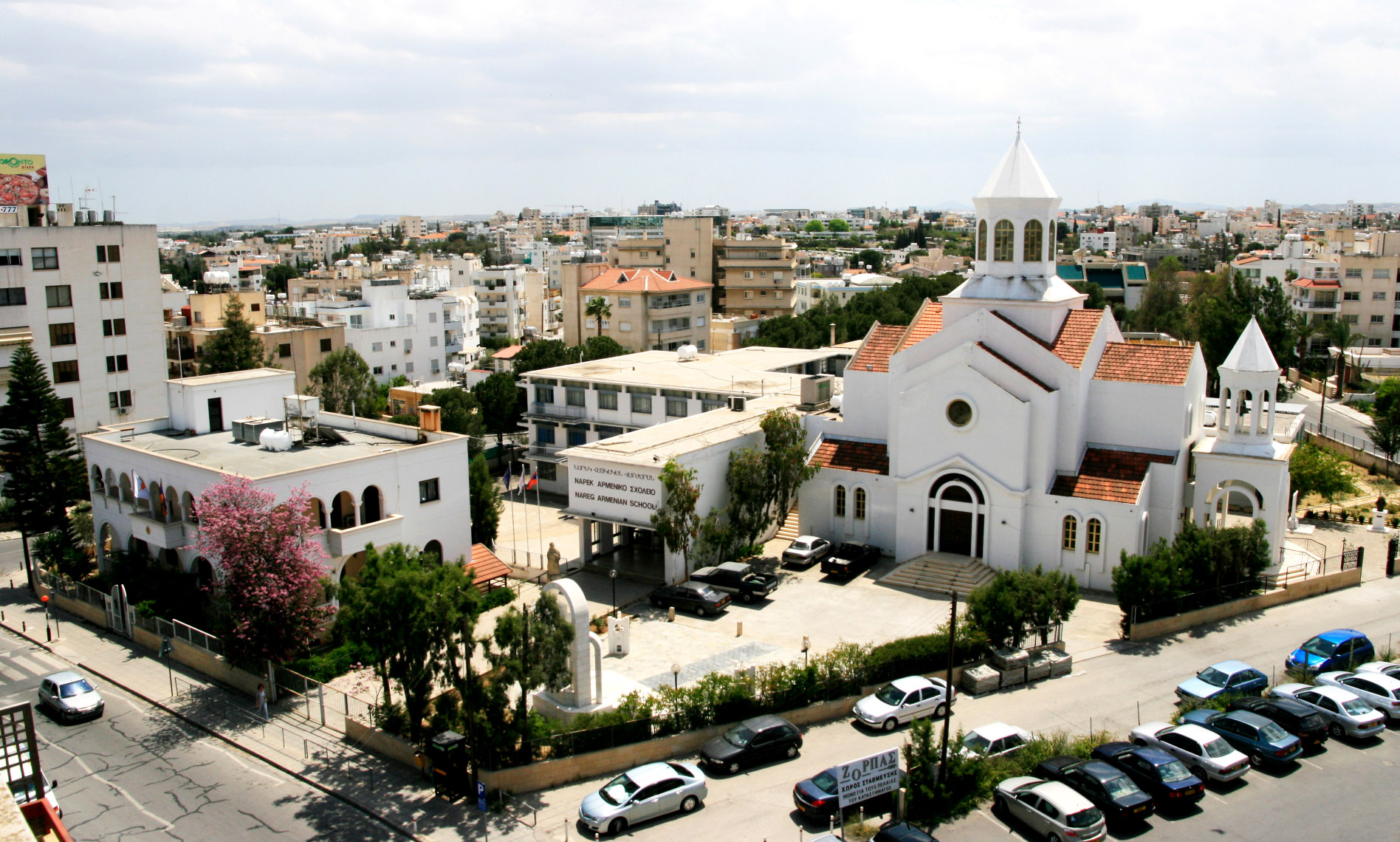
The Armenian compound in Strovolos, location of the Virgin Mary cathedral, Nareg Armenian school and the Armenian Genocide Monument in Nicosia

There are five Armenian Orthodox churches in Cyprus, two in the capital Nicosia (one in the north) and one each in Larnaca, Limassol and Famagusta. Additionally, there are three Armenian chapels in the vicinity of Nicosia and one within the Magaravank complex, the latter in the north. There is also an Armenian Evangelical church in North Nicosia. Finally, there is the Magaravank in the north.

== Education ==
Armenians have always attached particular emphasis in education, which – in conjunction with the Church – is the foundation for the preservation of their national and cultural heritage. Armenian schools teach Armenology, which includes Armenian history and traditions, ensuring the perpetuation of Armenianism from generation to generation.

== Monuments ==
The Armenian Cypriot community has several historical monuments, including the Armenian genocide Monument in Nicosia and a mortar obelisk dedicated to Abbot Mekhitar.

== The Armenian quarter of Nicosia ==
The original Armenian quarter (13th – late 15th/early 16th century) may have been located in the eastern part of Frankish Nicosia and that Armenians acquired their new quarter within the 16th century. After the conquest of the city in 1570, the Ottomans renamed the extant Armenian quarter to "Karamanzade mahallesi" (literally: quarter of the son of Karaman), in honour of one of the generals who took part in the conquest of Cyprus and came from Karaman Eyalet. From the 16th century to December 1963, the western part of walled Nicosia formed what was known as the Armenian Quarter (Αρμενομαχαλλάς in Greek language), '(Հայկական թաղ in Armenian language) or (Ermeni mahallesi in Turkish language). Administratively, the Armenian Quarter included both the Karaman Zade quarter and the Arab Ahmed Pasha quarter.

After the British Empire gained control of Cyprus from the Ottoman Empire, this part of the city housed several British officers. Their presence, together with that of the Latins, gave it the unofficial Greek name Φραγκομαχαλλάς for "Levantine Quarter". The first hotels of Nicosia opened on Victoria street during this time, including the "Armenian Hotel" (c. 1875- c. 1925) and the "Army and Navy Hotel" (1878 – c. 1890), resulting in the first cutting of the Venetian walls at the end of Victoria street.

The heart of the Armenian quarter was Victoria street (Վիքթորիա փողոց/οδός Βικτωρίας/Viktorya sokağı), in which the Armenian compound was located, as well as many houses and, at a later time, the AGBU club house; at times, AYMA's club house was there as well. The street, full of ashlar buildings, started from the Latin church of the Holy Cross and ended at the Arab Ahmed Pasha mosque, having Mahmoud Pasha street as its extension (where the American Academy Nicosia was between 1922 and 1955 and the Armenian Evangelical church since 1946). As it was a one-way street, traffic was only allowed from the north to the south.

During the Cypriot intercommunal violence, a large part of the Armenian Quarter of Nicosia was gradually taken over by Turkish Cypriots between 21 December 1963 and 19 January 1964. Most Armenian Cypriots left their homes during this time, while other families stayed for a longer period in tents at the grounds of the Melkonian Educational Institute.

The Armenian quarter was also home to many Turkish Cypriots, as well as some Greek Cypriots, Maronite Cypriots, Roman Catholic Cypriots and British nationals.

== Notable personalities ==
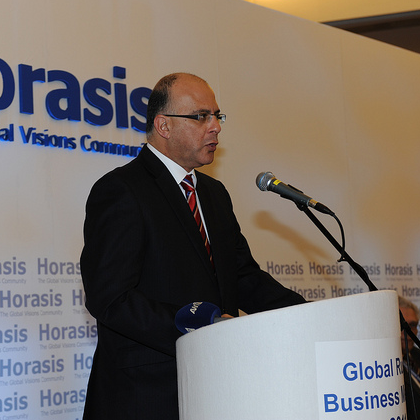
Marios Garoyian in 2011

- Khoren Paroyian (1914–1983), the Catholicos of Cilicia between 1963 and 1983
- Levon Chilingirian (born 1948), a violinist, conductor and music professor at the Royal College of Music who thrives in London, United Kingdom
- Marios Garoyian (born 1961), the current Chairman of the DIKO party and the ex-Speaker of the House of Representatives of Cyprus (2008–2011)
- Nouritza Matossian (born 1948), a writer, actress, broadcaster and human rights activist who thrives in London, United Kingdom
- Benon Sevan (born 1937), once the Assistant Secretary-General of the United Nations (1992–2005) and the Head of the Oil-for-Food Programme (1996–2005). He lives in Nicosia
- Nora Nadjarian (born 1966), poet
- Ara Bedrossian (born 1967), former football player
- Hovig Demirjian (born 1989), singer
- Garo Yepremian (1944–2015), American football Placekicker primarily for the NFL Miami Dolphins

== Timeline ==
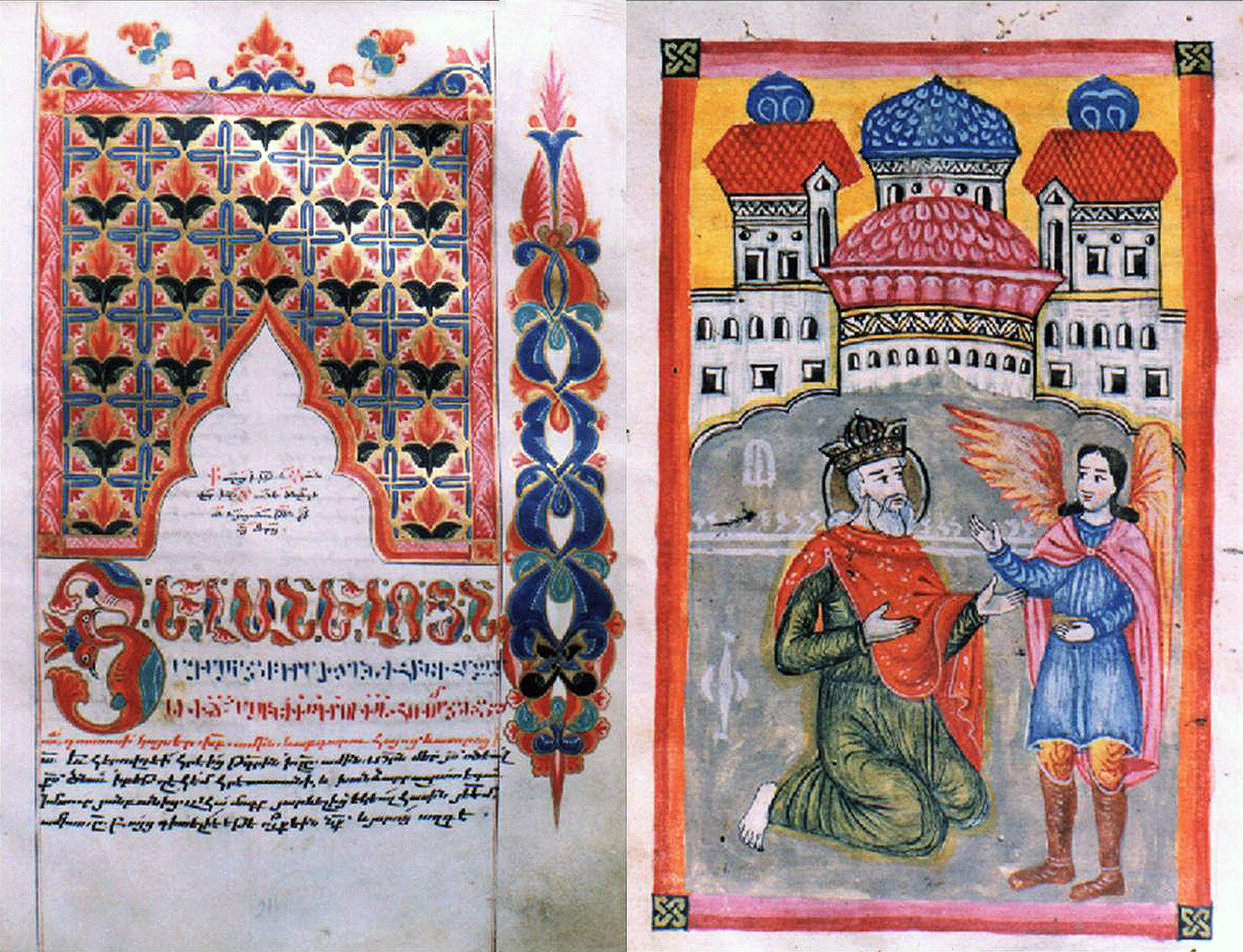
Illuminated manuscripts kept at the Magaravank until the early 20th century

- 578 AD: The first documented presence of Armenians in Cyprus.
- 610–641: Some Armenians arrive during the reign of Armenian-descended Byzantine Emperor Heraclius for political reasons.
- 717–728: Some Armenians arrive during the pontificate of Catholicos Hovhannes Odznetsi for commercial reasons.
- 965: More Armenians arrive after the liberation of Cyprus from the Arab raids by patrician Niketas Chalkoutzes for military reasons.
- 973: Catholicos Khatchig I establishes the Armenian Prelature of Cyprus in Nicosia.
- 1136–1138: Byzantine Emperor John II Komnenos moves the entire population of the Armenian city of Tell Hamdun to Cyprus.
- 1185: Byzantine Duke Isaac Komnenos brings with him Armenian warriors after his wedding to the daughter of Prince Thoros II.
- 1267: Several Armenians flee to Cyprus after the Fall of Jerusalem.
- 1291: Many Armenians arrive in Cyprus after the Fall of Acre.
- 1309: King Oshin exiles to Cyprus a large number of Armenians who were against the decision of the Latinophile Council of Sis.
- 1322: 30,000 Armenians escape to Cyprus after the Saracen attacks on Cilicia.
- 1335 and 1346: A new wave of Armenian refugees arrives in Cyprus after the Mameluke attacks on Cilicia.
- 1403 and 1421: Thousands of Armenians arrive in Cyprus after the Ottoman conquest of Cilicia.
- 1441: Some Armenians from Cilicia are encouraged to settle in Famagusta.
- May 1571: The Notre Dame de Tyre or Tortosa church is officially granted to the Armenians of Nicosia by a firman.
- July 1821: Amongst the 470 executions by the Ottomans is the Armenian priest of Nicosia, der Bedros.
- 1894–1896: The Hamidian massacres take place in Ottoman Turkey, resulting in 300,000 deaths. About 1,000 Armenians find refuge in Cyprus, of whom only about 100 stay. These refugees hailed mainly from Dikranagerd, Aintab and Kilis.
- 1909: The Adana massacre takes place in the Adana province, resulting in 30,000 deaths. About 2,000 Armenians flee to Cyprus; almost all of them return within the year.
- 1915–1923: Ottomans and Young Turks perpetrate the Armenian genocide, causing over 1,500,000 deaths. About 8,000 Armenian refugees arrive in Cyprus, of whom about 1,300 settle permanently. These refugees mainly hailed from Adana, Silifke, Sis, Marash, Tarsus, Caesarea, Hadjin and Aintab.
- 1916–1918: The Armenian Legion is formed and trained in Monarga, near Boghazi, consisting of over 4,000 Diasporan Armenians, who later fought the Ottoman Empire.
- 17 November 1953: Transmission of the first Armenian broadcast on CyBC radio.
- 8 March 1957: Arson of the Ganchvor church by extremist Turkish Cypriots.
- 16 August 1960: Cyprus gains its Independence; Armenians are recognised as a "religious group" by the Constitution.
- 13 November 1960: Armenian Cypriots opt in the referendum to belong to the Greek Cypriot community.
- 15 July 1961: Limassol's Mayor Costas Partassides delivers the golden key of the Limassol Armenian cemetery to Mihran Bastadjian, Chairman of Limassol's Armenian church committee
- 24 April 1975: Recognition of the Armenian genocide by the House of Representatives
- 10 December 1979: Strovolos Improvement Board renames Cyclops street into Armenia street. The street sign is officially placed on 15 January 1980.
- 19 April 1990: The House of Representatives recognises 24 April as National Remembrance Day for the Armenian genocide.
- 24 April 1991: Official presentation of the new Armenian Genocide monument, in the courtyard of the Virgin Mary church in Strovolos, Nicosia.
- 1 December 2002: Armenian is recognised as a minority language in Cyprus.
- 24 November 2006: Armenian President Robert Kocharyan lays the foundation stone for the Armenian Genocide Memorial in Larnaca.

== See also ==
- Armenia–Cyprus relations
- Armenian diaspora
- Armenians in Greece
- Armenians in Turkey
- Armenians in the United Kingdom
- Languages of Cyprus

== Notes ==
- PIO Booklet "The Armenians of Cyprus"
- PIO Booklet "Οι Αρμένιοι της Κύπρου"
- Book on the Armenians of Cyprus
- Brochure on the Armenians of Cyprus
- The Armenian Cypriot community (article in Greek)
- The Armenian education in Cyprus (CHRONICLE in Greek)
- The Republic of Cyprus and the Religious Groups (book in Greek)
- Presentation on the Armenian Cypriot community (in Greek)
- Armenians in Cyprus (schools, churches, clubs)
- Information on the Armenians of Cyprus

== Video documentaries ==
- The Armenians in Cyprus (English)
- Οι Αρμένιοι στην Κύπρο (Greek)
