= Limassol Armenian cemetery =

Cemetery in Cyprus

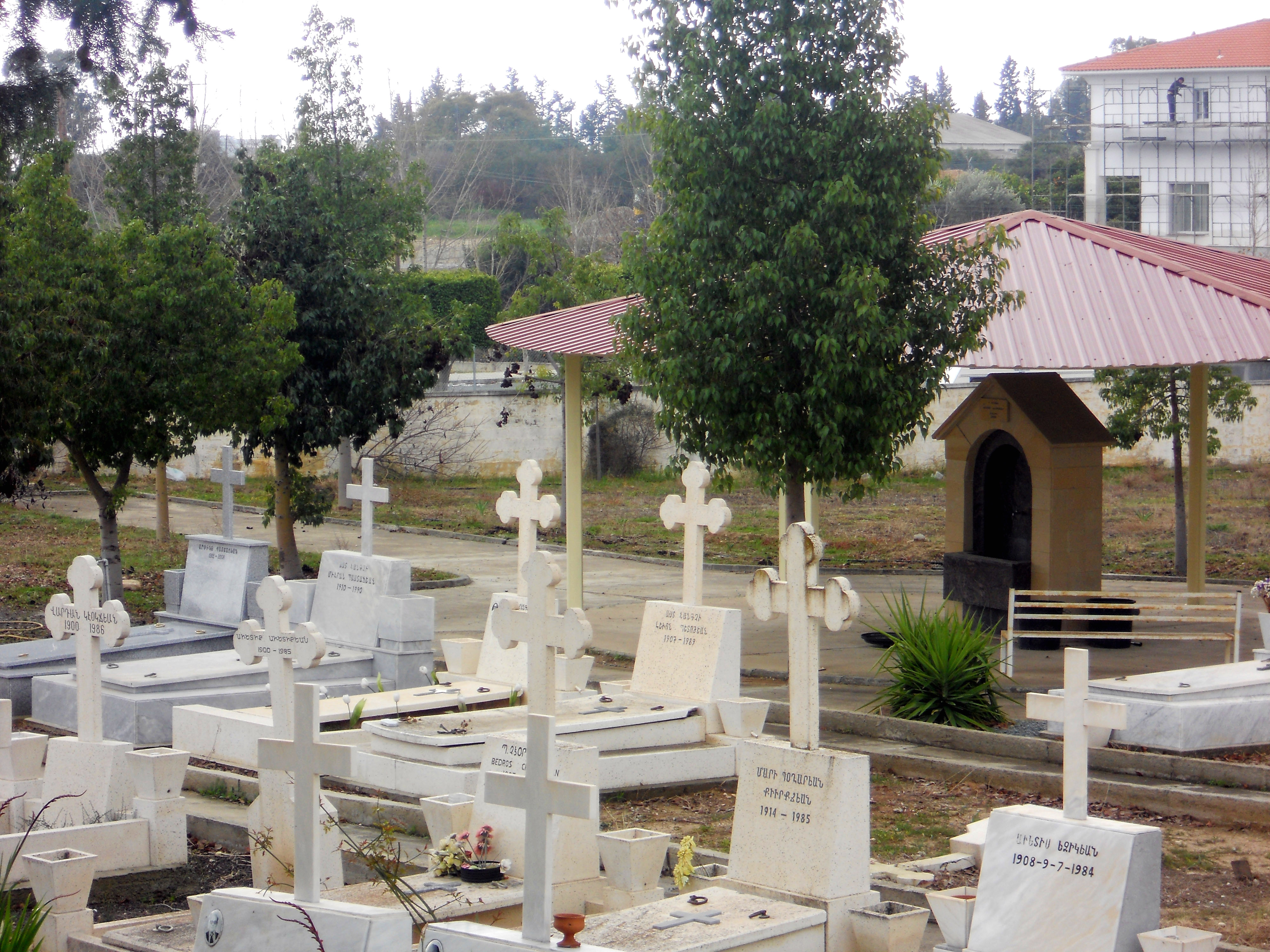
View of Limassol's Armenian cemetery

The Armenian cemetery of Limassol is located on the western part of the Limassol-Platres road, within the administrative area of Kato Polemidhia. The land was granted to the Armenian-Cypriot community by the colonial government of Cyprus in 1946, but did not become operational until July 1960, because of the Law that stipulated that cemeteries need to have a wall separating them from their surrounding area. This wall was constructed by donation of the then Mayor of Limassol, Costas Partasides, who was a member of AKEL. Until then, deceased Armenian-Cypriots from Limassol were buried primarily in Nicosia or Larnaca.

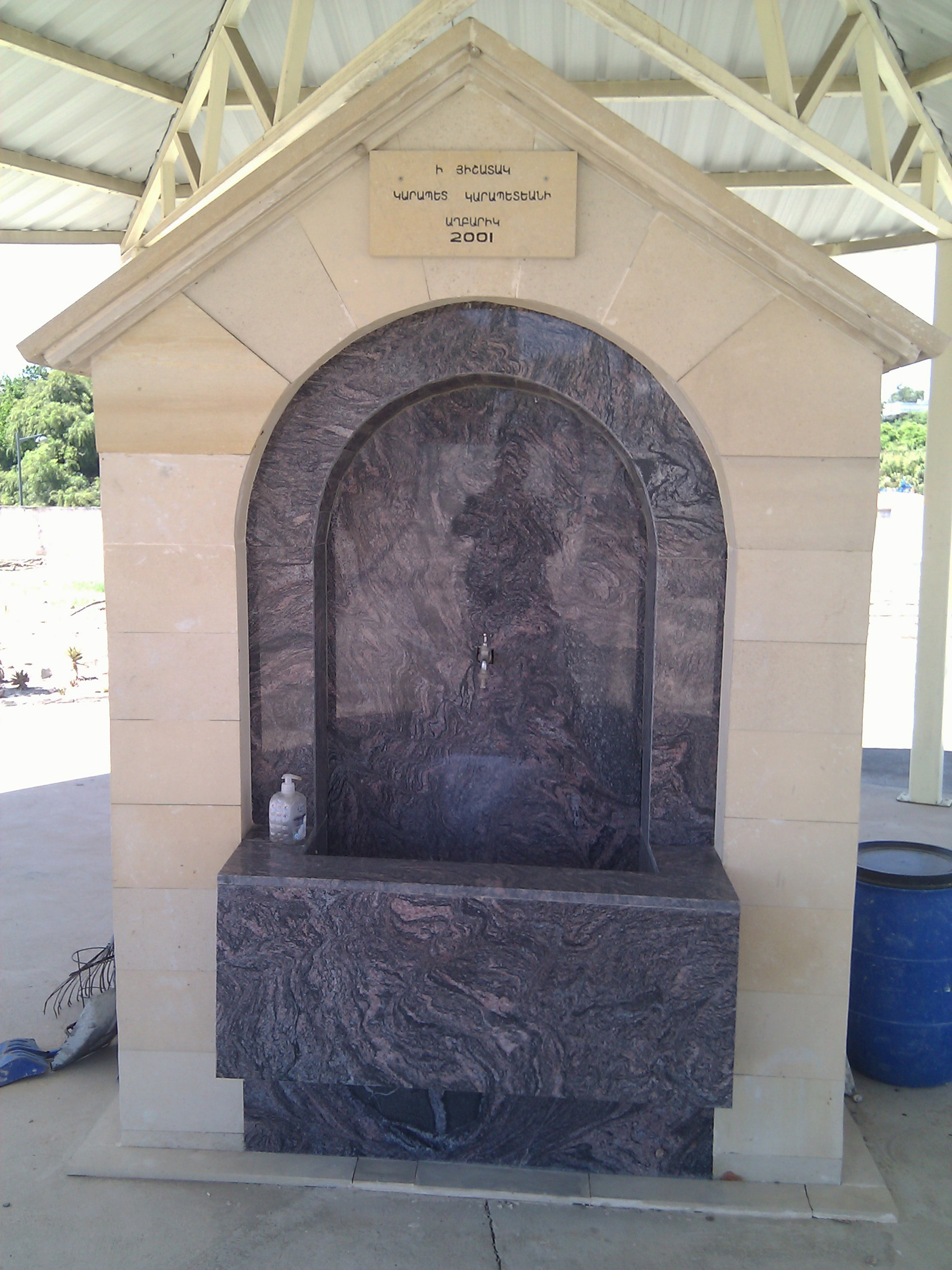
The cemetery's fountain

On 16 July 1961, Mayor Partasides handed over the golden key of the cemetery to Mihran Bastadjian, Chairman of the Armenian church Committee of Limassol.

About 210 burials have taken place at this cemetery, covering about a third of its total area (4,844 m², or 3 donums 2 evleks and 1,740 sq. ft). In 2003, due to the widening of the Limassol-Platres road, 17 tombs were moved westwards. The cemetery is the start of the Garyllis river linear park, which was completed in 2015 and finishes at the old harbour.

In the center of the cemetery, there is a dark purple granite fountain, covered with beige stone, which was commissioned in 2002 by Sarkis and Takouhi Grabedian in memory of Garabed Garabedian (Aghparig), who had died in 2001. On its top it bears the following stone inscription in Armenian:

Ի յիշատակ Կարապետ Կարապետեանի Աղբարիկ 2001 (In memory of Garabed Garabedian Aghparig 2001)

In 2006, a shelter was constructed on top of the fountain.

== See also ==
- Armenian Prelature of Cyprus
- Sourp Kevork Church, Limassol
- Armenians in Cyprus
- Limassol Armenian school
