= Ganchvor Monastery =

Coordinates: 35.1273°N 33.93635°E

- Ganchvor Sourp Asdvadzadzin
- Կանչուոր Սուրբ Աստուածածին
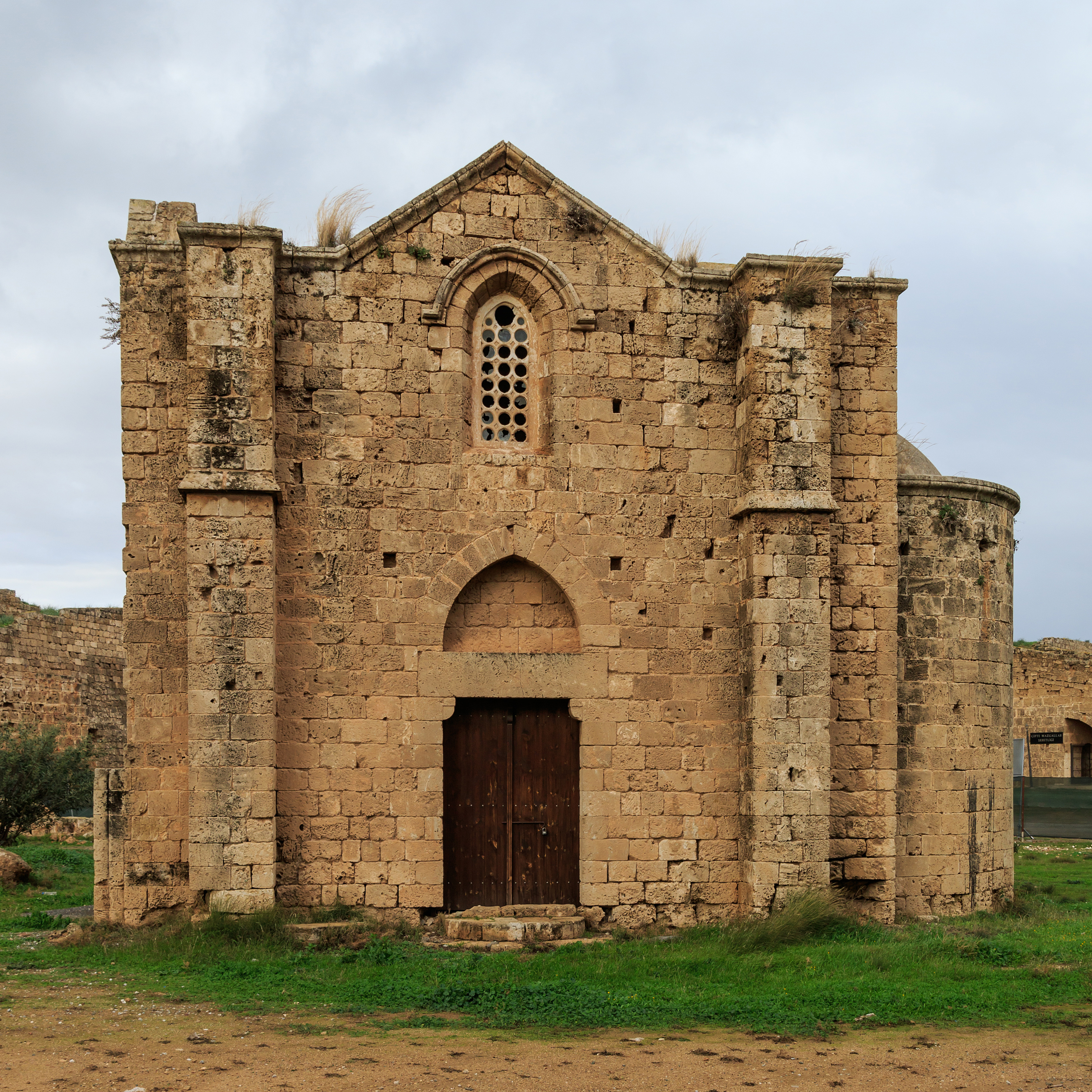
- Ganchvor Church
- Ganchvor Monastery
- Location: Famagusta
- Country: Cyprus
- Denomination: Armenian Apostolic

Architecture
- Style: Typical Armenian
- Completed: 1346

Ganchvor Monastery (Armenian: Կանչուոր Սուրբ Աստուածածին Ganchvor Sourp Asdvadzadzin) is the Armenian Apostolic church in Famagusta, Cyprus.

== History ==
The church is located on the north-west side of the walled city of Famagusta, opposite the Carmelite church. It is a fortress-like building built in 1346 by Armenian refugees from Cilicia. It was built in a typical Armenian fashion, but with Cypriot masonry, and was part of an important monastic and cultural centre, where Nerses of Lambron is said to have studied in the 12th century, suggesting the presence of an important theological institute.

Unused since 1571, it was preserved by the Department of Antiquities in 1907, and on 7 March 1936, it was leased to the Armenian community of Famagusta for a period of 99 years. After repairs between 1937 and 1944, the first Liturgy and re-consecration took place on 14 January 1945 by Archimandrite Krikor Bahlavouni. It was partially burnt by Turkish-Cypriots on 8 March 1957. Afterwards, it was no longer used as a church.

During the 1963–1964 inter-communal violence, the area around it was taken over by Turkish Resistance Organisation and then in August 1974 by the Turkish military, becoming part of the occupied area. Even after the partial lifting of restrictions by the Northern Cypriot authorities in 2003, it was still inaccessible, as it was located within a "military area". It has been accessible since late 2005.

After a restoration process by the UNDP-PFF was carried out between May 2017 and May 2018, its handover ceremony took place on 26 May 2018, together with the Carmelite church.

== See also ==
- Armenian Prelature of Cyprus
- Armenians in Cyprus – Ethnic Armenians living in Cyprus
