= Limassol Armenian school =

Armenian school in Limassol, Cyprus

Nareg Armenian School Αρμενικό Σχολείο Ναρέκ (Greek) Նարեկ Հայկական Վարժարան (Armenian)
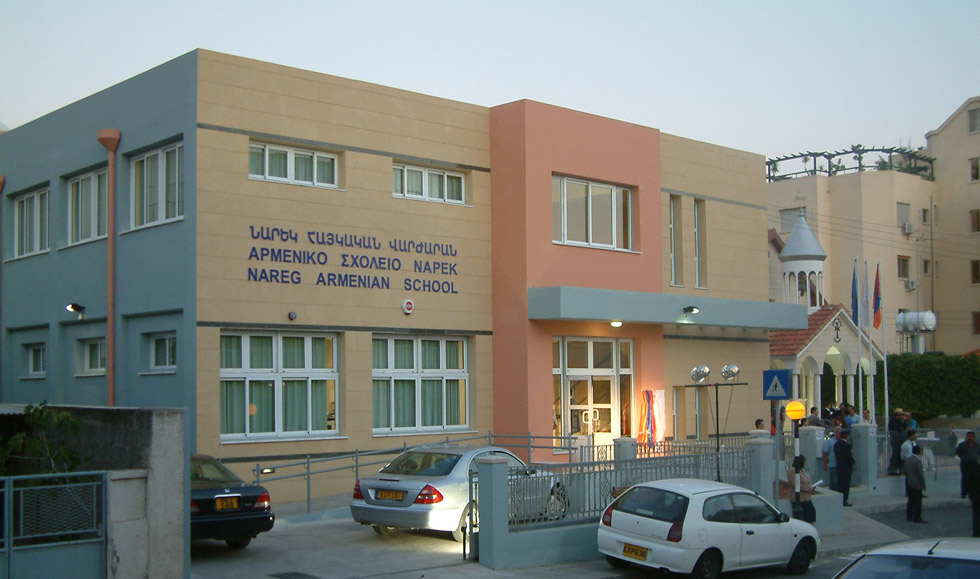
- Main entrance view

Location
- Limassol, Cyprus
- Coordinates: 34°40′59″N 33°2′34″E

Information
- Founded: 1928; 97 years ago
- School district: Limassol

The Nareg Armenian School (Greek: Αρμενικό Σχολείο Ναρέκ; Armenian: Նարեկ Հայկական Վարժարան), also known as the Limassol Armenian School, is located on 16, Vassilis Michaelides street in central Limassol, next to the Sourp Kevork (Saint George) church. Since 1972, Armenian Elementary Schools in Cyprus (Nicosia, Larnaca, Limassol and, until 1974, Famagusta) are called Nareg, in memory of Saint Krikor Naregatsi (951-1003).

The current building was built between 2006 and 2007 by the Technical Services of the Ministry of Education and Culture and was inaugurated on 5 November 2008 by then-President of Cyprus Demetris Christofias. Currently, the school has about 35 students. As with the other Nareg Schools (in Nicosia and Larnaca), Vera Tahmazian has been the Headmistress since 2009, and the school is under the tutelage of the Armenian Schools of Cyprus Committee.

The first Armenian school in Limassol operated in 1928, by initiative of Armenian Archbishop Bedros Saradjian, at the house of Siranoush Avedikian on Zena Gunther street. After the Sourp Kevork church was erected (1939–1940), lessons were held inside the church. In 1951, by initiative of priest Shahé Semerdjian and a donation by Ethiopian-Armenian Roupen Babigian, the initial building of the Armenian National School was built, which was inaugurated on 17 November 1951. In 1954, by donation of the Limassol Armenian youth, the building was expanded and as of then, all lessons were held inside the school.

== See also ==
- Armenian Cypriots
- Armenian Prelature of Cyprus
- Sourp Kevork Church, Limassol
