= American Academy Nicosia =

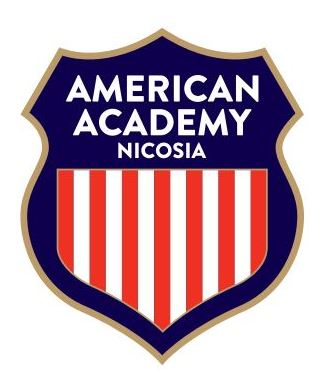

Location
- 3A Michael Paridi Street; Nicosia; Cyprus
- 35.1700°N 33.3520°E

Information
- Type: Day School
- Established: 1922
- CEO: Alecos Kantartzis
- Colour: Red White Blue
- Publication: The Echo
- Website: http://www.aan.ac.cy

The American Academy Nicosia is a private non-profit school comprising a preschool (for ages 3–5), a primary department (years 1-6 for ages 6–11) and a secondary department (Years 7-13 for ages 12–18). It is located in central Nicosia, Cyprus. From its establishment it has served all the communities of Cyprus. The school is recognized by the Ministry of Education and Culture.

The student body currently is representative not only of the different communities in Cyprus but it also has an international element, with many pupils coming from other European countries, with Asia, Africa, Oceania and the Americas also represented. The language of instruction is English. Despite its name, the school actually follows the National Curriculum for England, with secondary school students being prepared for IGCSEs and A-Levels. The Greek language is taught at all levels of the primary and secondary departments ensuring fluency for native Greek speakers and supporting competence in the basics for non-native speakers. French, Spanish and Italian are also offered. The School Diploma, recognized by the Ministry of Education as equivalent to the state-school diploma (Apolytirion), is awarded to students upon graduation.

== History ==
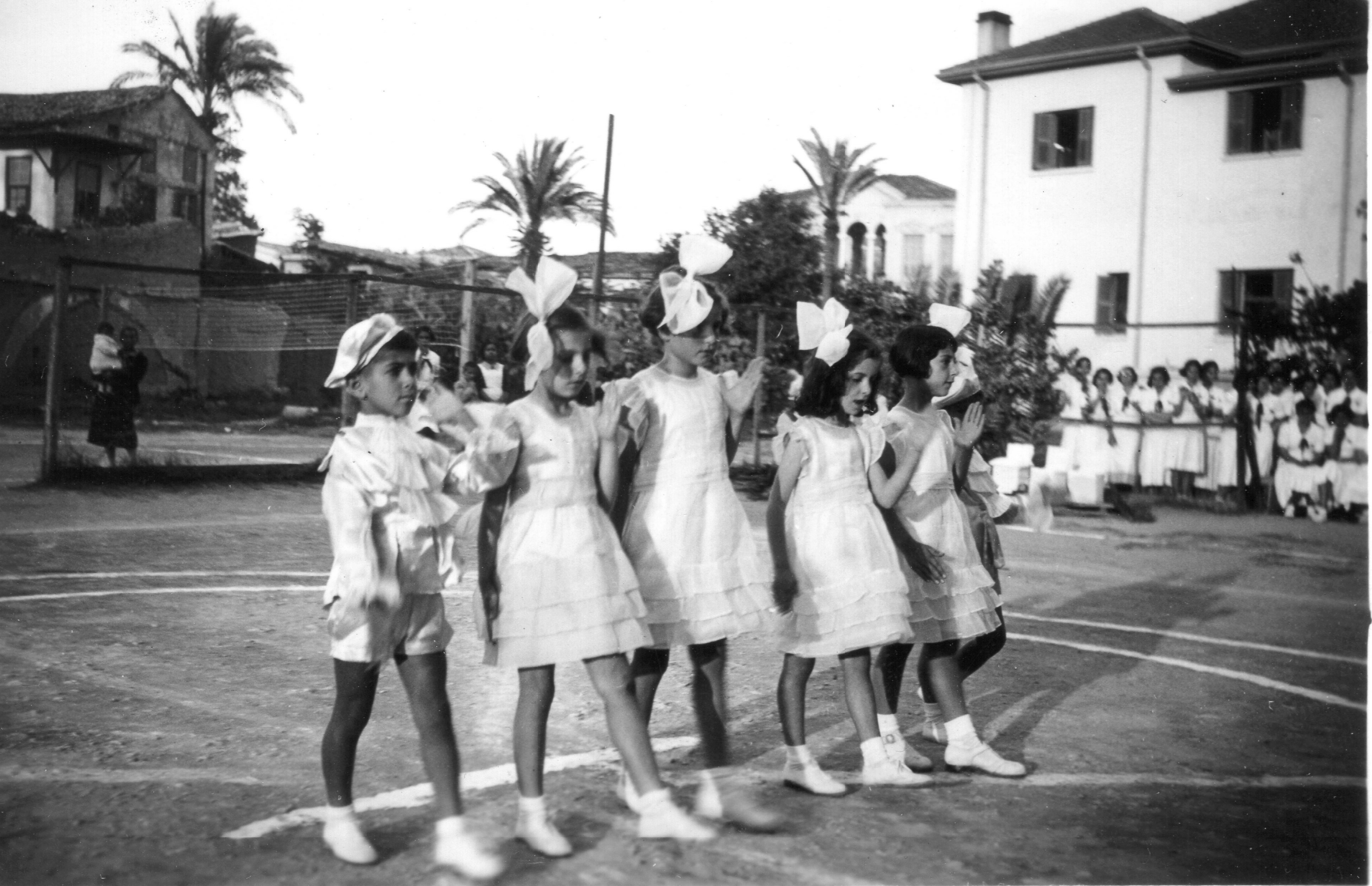
Boys and girls of the primary school perform in Mayday celebrations 1935

The School opened its doors on October 16, 1922. The founders, who had earlier started the American Academy in Larnaca for boys, established the school in response to local demand for an English language school for girls and it was named the American Academy for Girls. In its early years it was both a boarding and a day school and thirteen students enrolled in its first year, two of them boarders. The teacher who headed up the work was Lola Weir with Ada Wilson being her assistant. Helen and Iphigenia Aegyptiades, refugees from Smyrna, former teachers at the American University there, came on staff to teach music and home economics respectively. School and boarding house were originally in the west side of the old city of Nicosia. Growth was quite rapid and by 1927 the enrolment had reached 89 students.

The school year 1941-1942 saw the Academy evacuated to Kyrenia, due to the fear of enemy action in World War II, with a return the following year. Relocation to its present premises outside the city walls in 1955 provided more extensive grounds and larger buildings. In 1976 the school became independent from its founding mission with a board of Cypriot educationalists and businessmen set up to manage it. In 1977 the school became coeducational and in the years that followed, there was an expansion in both its enrollment, its grounds and buildings.

== Campus and location ==
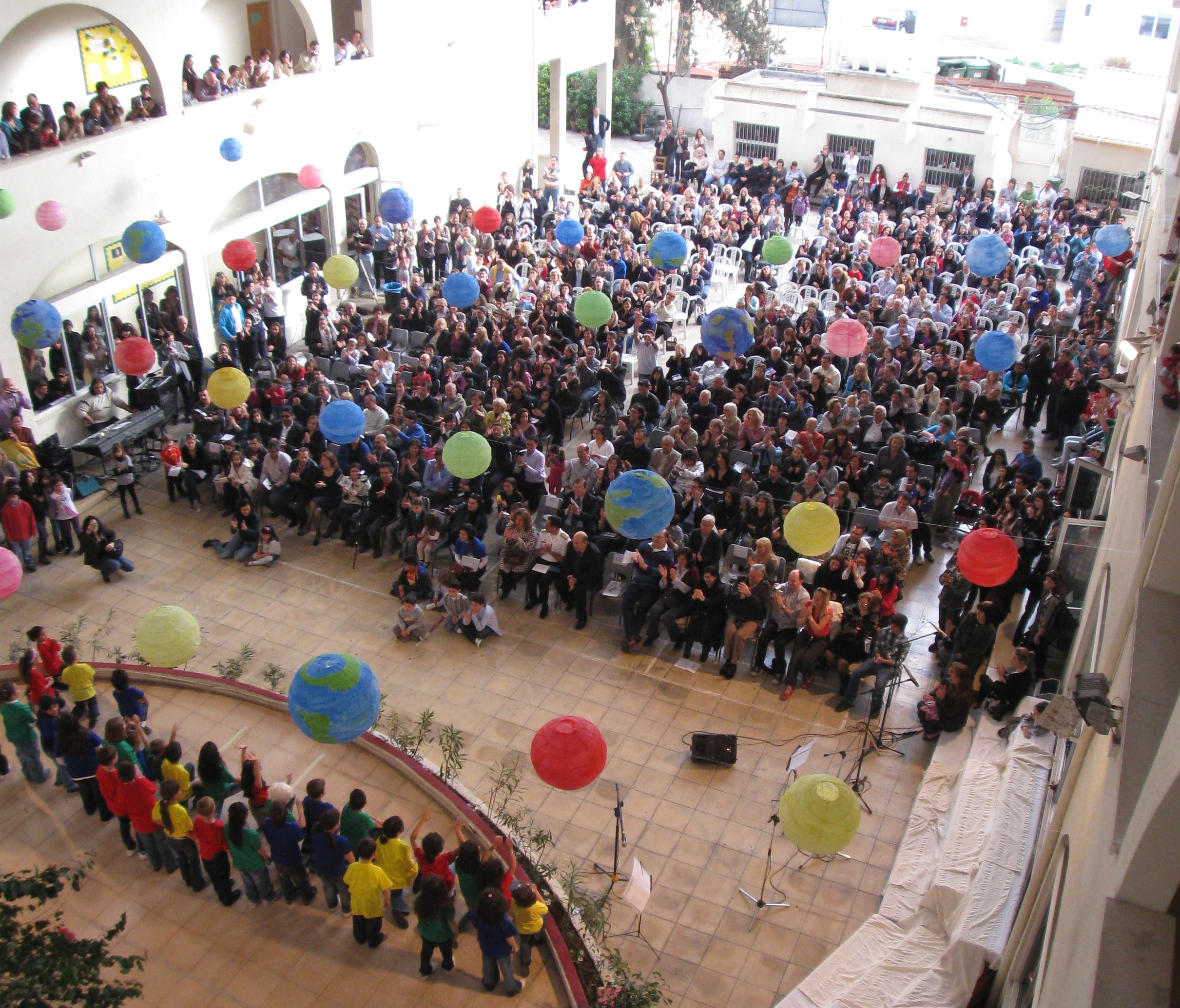
International Day celebrations in main building quadrangle

The campus is located a short distance southwest of the old city on the eastern bank of the Pedieos River. Preschool, primary and secondary departments each have their own buildings whilst benefiting from a shared campus. In the campus there is an outdoor quadrangle, one astroturf, a tarmac volleyball court, and a jungle gym.

== Academic achievements ==
Statistics for how the students of the school score in their external exams are presented below:

99% overall success in I/GCSE
93% overall success at A-LEVEL

== Sports ==
The school takes part in the Nicosia district championships in basketball and volleyball for boys and girls, competing with teams of the state schools and other private schools. Despite its comparatively small size the school has attained several distinctions. The girls’ volleyball team (years 7-9) were district champions and national finalists in 2008-09 whereas the boys’ basketball team (years 7-9) were national finalists for 2006-07 and district and national champions 2012-13. An annual tennis tournament for Nicosia private schools was established in 2010 by the American Academy Nicosia. Special arrangements with local sports academies allow especially talented young people to complete the core curriculum at the Academy whilst maintaining practice schedules in their particular field of sport.
