= Nerses of Lambron =

Armenian Archbishop (1153–1198)

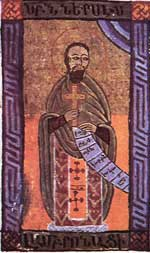
Nerses of Lambron in miniature of 1643

Saint Nerses of Lambron (Armenian: Ներսես Լամբրոնացի, Nerses Lambronatsi) (1153–1198) was the Archbishop of Tarsus in the Armenian Kingdom of Cilicia who is remembered as one of the most significant figures in Armenian literature and ecclesiastical history.

== Life ==
Nerses was the son of the Hethumid lord of Lambron, Oshin II, and the nephew of the Catholicos (1166–1173) Nerses IV. His mother Shahandukht was a descendant of St. Gregory the Illuminator. Nerses was well versed in sacred and profane sciences and had an excellent knowledge of Greek, Latin, Syriac, and probably Coptic. His early education was at Skevravank (Skevra monastery) which was continued at Hromkla under the supervision of his uncle Nerses and Grigor Tgha (Gregory IV the Young, Catholicos from 1173 to 1193). Ordained in 1169 at the age of 16 by his uncle, he was elevated to episcopacy and consecrated Archbishop of Tarsus in 1176. He went on to study at the Ganchvor Monastery, an Armenian Apostolic church in present-day Cyprus.

Nerses became a zealous advocate of the union of the Greek and Armenian Churches. In 1179 he attended the Council of Hromkla, in which the terms of the union were discussed; his address at this council is considered a masterpiece of eloquence and style. The union was decided upon but never consummated owing to the death of Emperor Manuel Comnenus in 1180. Manuel's successors abandoned the negotiations and persecuted the Armenians, who were dissatisfied with the Byzantines and turned to the Latins. Leo II, Prince of Cilicia, desirous to secure for himself the title of King of Armenia, sought the support of Pope Celestine III and of Emperor Henry VI. The pope received his request favourably, but made the granting of it dependent upon the union of Cilicia to the Church of Rome. He sent Conrad, Archbishop of Mainz, to Tarsus, and the terms of union having been signed by Leo and twelve of the bishops, among whom was Nerses, Leo was crowned King of Armenia, 6 January 1198. Nerses died six months afterwards, on 17 July.

Saint Nerses of Lambron is commemorated July 17th and August 15th by the Armenian Apostolic Church and the Armenian Catholic Church.

== Works ==
Nerses is justly regarded as one of the greatest writers in Armenian literature. He deserves fame as poet, prose writer, and translator. He wrote an elegy on the death of his uncle, Nerses IV, and many hymns. His prose works include his oration at the Council of Hromcla (tr. Italian by Aucher, Venice, 1812; tr. German by Neumann, Leipzig, 1834, and by Baumer, Trier, 2013); Commentaries on the Psalms, Proverbs, Ecclesiastes, Wisdom, and the Minor Prophets; an explanation of the liturgy; a letter to Leo II and another to Uskan, a monk of Antioch; and two homilies. He translated into Armenian the Rule of St. Benedict; the "Dialogues" of Gregory the Great; a life of this saint; and the letters of Lucius III and Clement III to the patriarch, Gregory. From the Syriac he translated the "Homilies" of Jacob of Serugh and, probably from the Coptic, the "Life of the Fathers of the Desert". Some writers ascribe to him an Armenian version of a commentary of Andreas of Caesarea on the Apocalypse. Nerses in his original writings frequently refers to the primacy and infallibility of the pope.

== See also ==
- Mekhitar of Sebaste
- Mekhitarists
- Vardapet
