= Monarga =

Monarga: Μoναργά (Greek); Boğaztepe (Turkish)
- Village
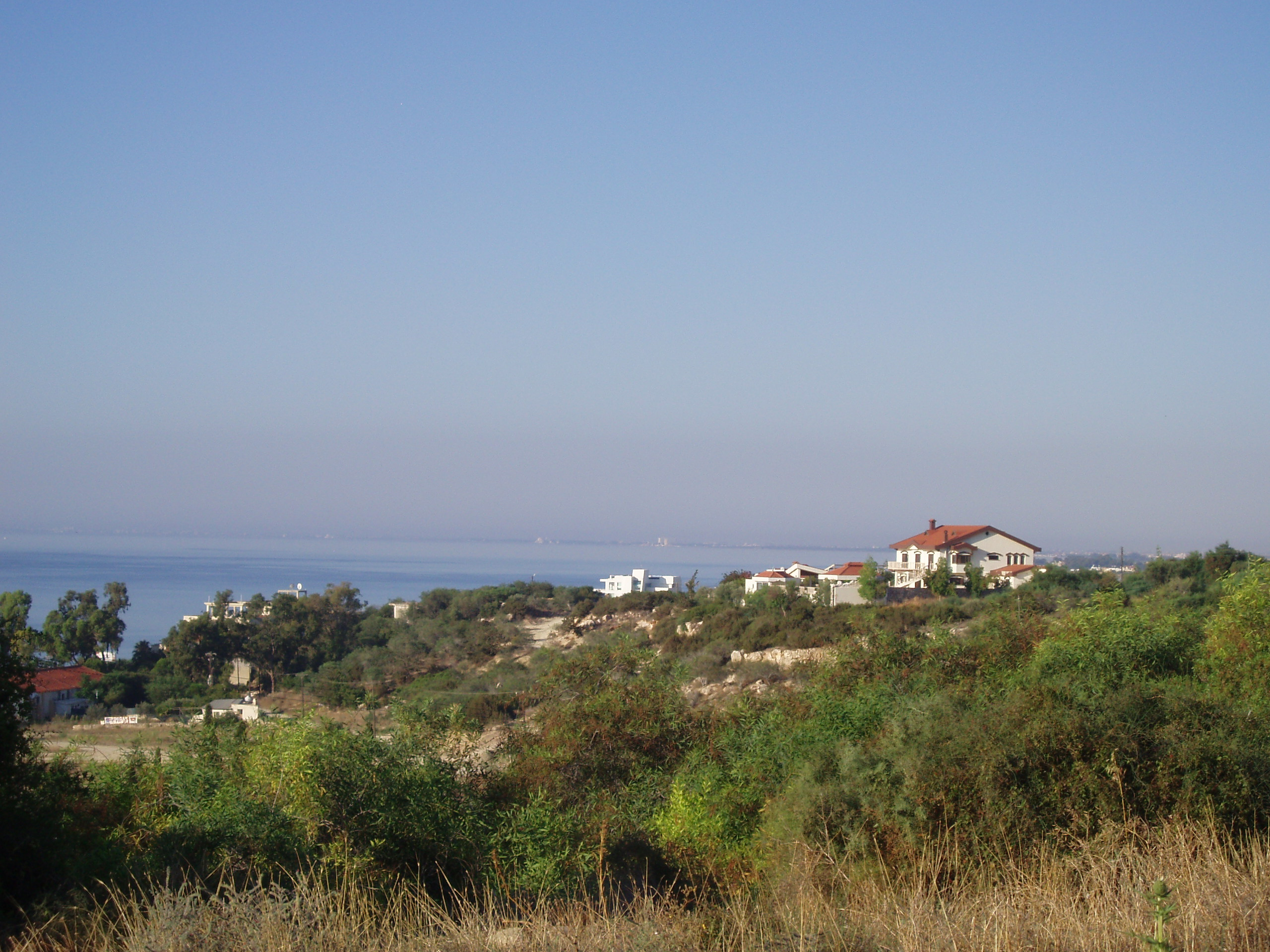

- Location in Cyprus
- Coordinates: 35°18′54″N 33°56′30″E
- Country (de jure): Cyprus
  - District: Famagusta District
- Country (de facto): Northern Cyprus
  - District: İskele District

Government
  - Mukhtar: Bohur Özoğlu

Population (2011)
  - Total: 312
- Time zone: UTC+2 (EET)
  - Summer (DST): UTC+3 (EEST)

Monarga (Greek: Μoναργά; Turkish: Boğaztepe) is a small village in the Famagusta District of Cyprus, located 7 km northeast of Trikomo. It is under the de facto control of Northern Cyprus.
