= Sourp Kevork Church, Limassol =

Church in Limassol, Cyprus

Coordinates: 34.683056°N 33.042778°E

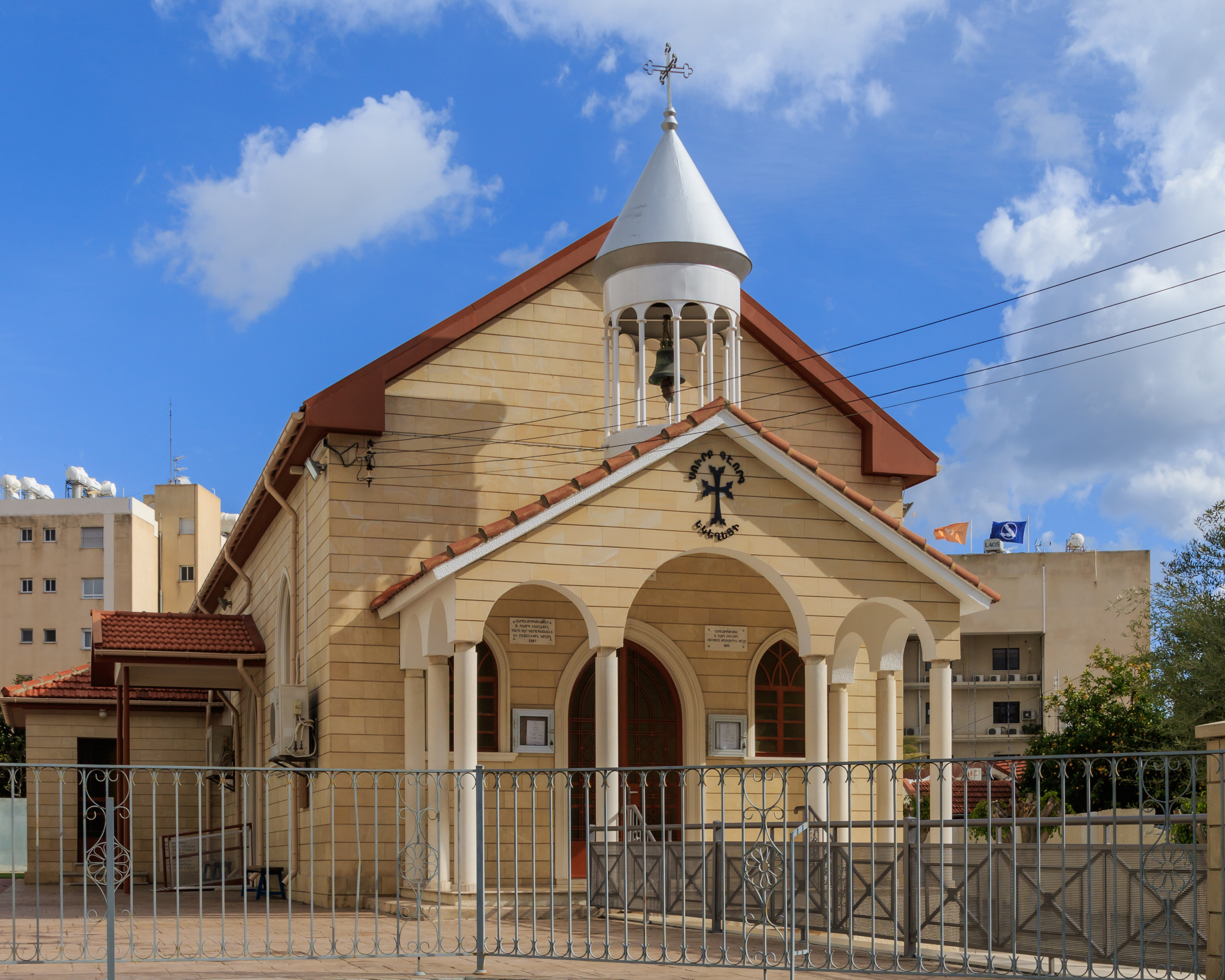
Sourp Kevork church in Limassol

Sourp Kevork (Armenian: Սուրբ Գէորգ; Saint George) is the Armenian Apostolic church in Limassol, Cyprus.

The church is located near the Limassol town centre and was built between 1939-1940 on land purchased and donated by Satenig Kevorkian-Soultanian, in memory of her father-in-law, Kevork Soultanian. The first official Liturgy took place in 1940 and its consecration took place on 11 April 1948 by Bishop Bishop Chebeyan. The church was renovated between 1975-1976, in 2007, and again in 2015 and in 2023. Its bell was made electronic in 1989.

The church is located on the same grounds as the Limassol Nareg Elementary School, whose current building was erected between 2006–2007. In front of the church is a dark brown tuff stone khachkar, donated in 2008 by the Arakelyan family, unveiled and consecrated by Archbishop Varoujan Hergelian on 28 September 2008.

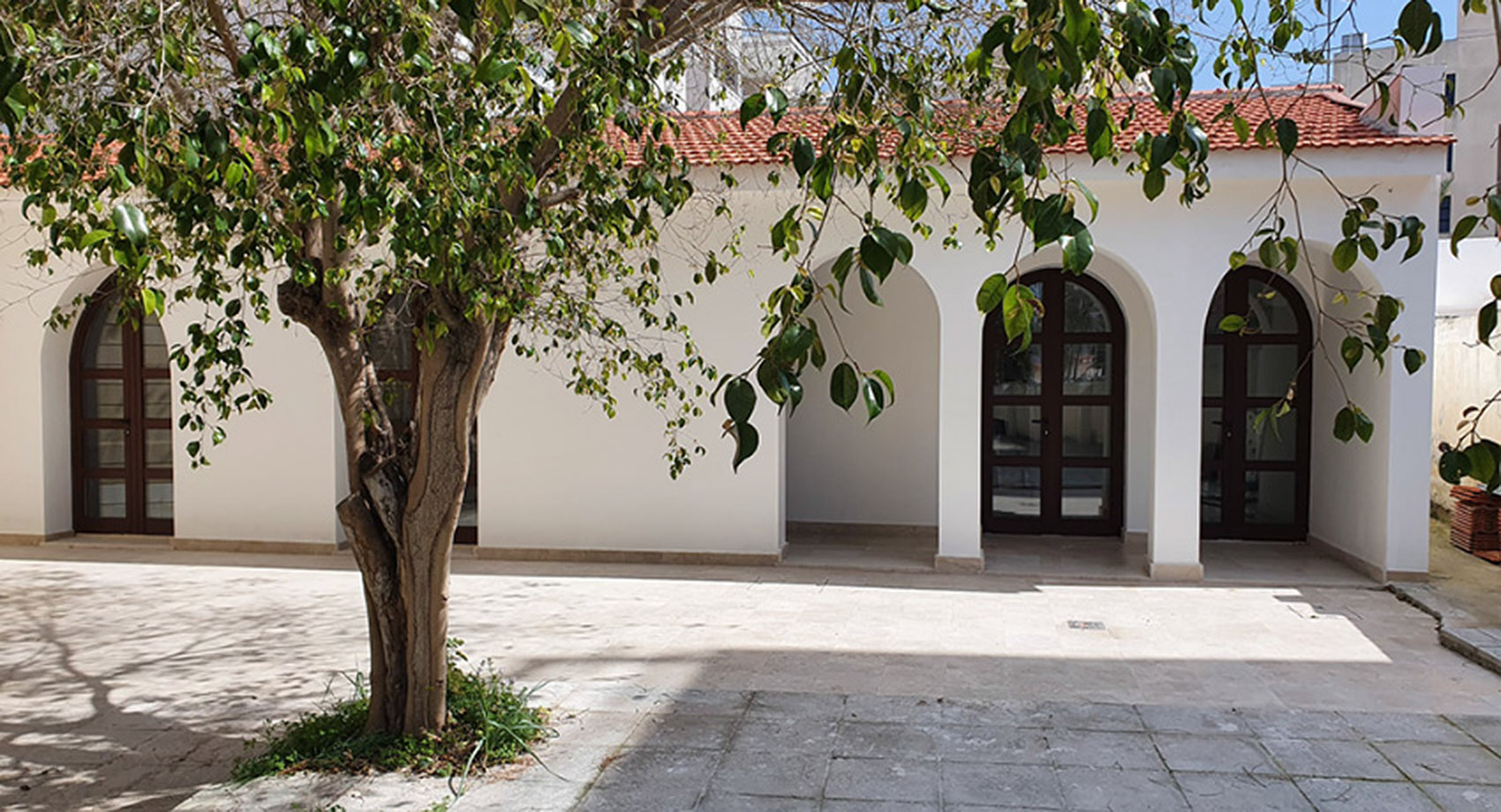
View of Limassol's Armenian church functions hall

To the east of the church there is the functions’ hall; constructed between 2020-2022, it was inaugurated on 19 February 2023 by Archbishop Khoren Toghramadjian. This functions’ hall replaced a previous hall, which had been placed there in 1959.

As of 17 October 2024, its spiritual shepherd is Senior Archimandrite Hovhannes Saghdejian. Liturgies are held three times a month, as once a month a Liturgy is held in Paphos.

== See also ==
- Armenians in Cyprus
- Armenian Prelature of Cyprus
- Limassol Armenian school
