= Religion in Northern Cyprus =

This article documents the status of various religions in the limited-recognition state of Northern Cyprus. Turkish Cypriots administer approximately one-third of the island.

The dominant religion is Sunni Islam. It is also home to a significant Alevi minority and a small Christian one.

== Islam ==
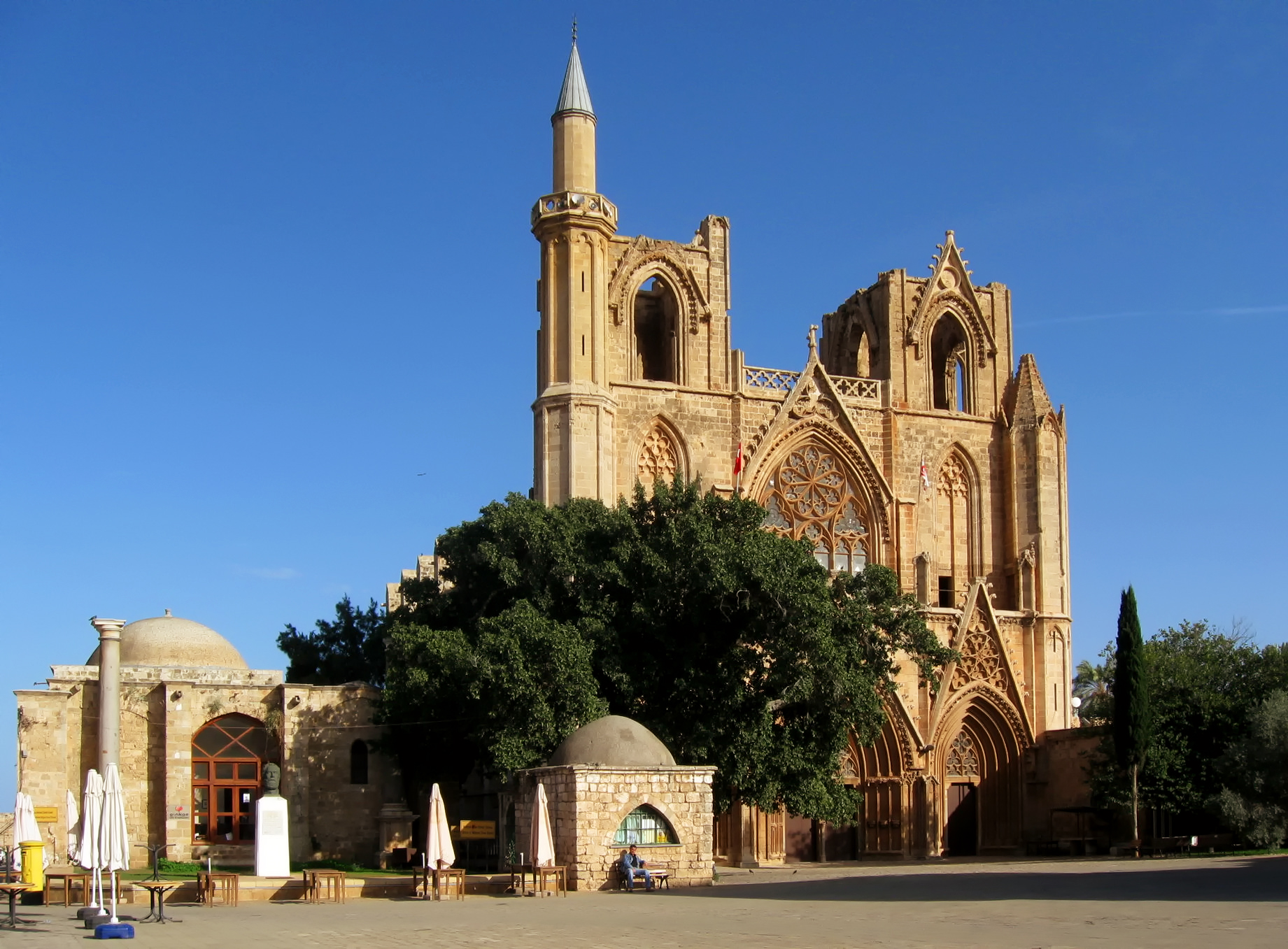
Lala Mustafa Pasha Mosque in Famagusta

The constitution states that the area is a secular republic and provides for freedom of conscience and religious faith. There are no official statistics on religion, but in 2022 it was estimated that 97% of the population is Sunni Muslim; the remainder was made up of Alevis, Protestants, Greek Orthodox, Maronite Catholics, Russian Orthodox, Anglican, Baha’is, Jews, and Jehovah’s Witnesses.

As of 2021, the chairman of the TRNC Directorate of Religious Affairs is Prof. Dr. Ahmet Ünsal.

There are 7 representatives of the Department: 5 of them in the 5 districts of Northern Cyprus, one in Lefka village, one in the south part of the Cyprus.

Islam was first introduced to Cyprus when Uthman, the third Caliph of the Arab Rashidun Empire, conquered the island in 649. Cyprus remained a disputed territory between the Greeks and Arabs for the following centuries, until it passed to Latin authority during the Crusades. The island was conquered by the Ottoman general Lala Mustafa Pasha from the Venetians in 1570. This conquest brought with it Turkish settlement from 1571 until 1878. During the 17th century especially, the Muslim population of the island grew rapidly, partly because of Turkish immigrants but also due to Greek converts to Islam.

Turkish Cypriots are the overwhelming majority of the island's Muslims, along with Turkish settlers from Turkey and adhere to the Sunni branch of Islam. Sufism also plays an important role. Historically, Muslims were spread over the whole of Cyprus, but since 1974 they have lived primarily in the north. The Ahmadiyya Community itself has a presence in north.

Several important Islamic shrines and landmarks exist on the island including:

- The Arabahmet Mosque in Nicosia (built in the 16th century)
- The Hala Sultan Tekke/Umm Haram Mosque in Larnaca (built in the 18th century)
- The Lala Mustafa Pasha Mosque, Selimiye Mosque and the Haydarpasha Mosque; former Catholic cathedrals left from the Crusader era, which were meant to cater exclusively to the Catholic minority which ruled the island and were converted to mosques after the Muslim conquest in the Middle Ages.

All of the listed, apart from the Hala Sultan Tekke, are in Northern Cyprus.

== Christianity ==
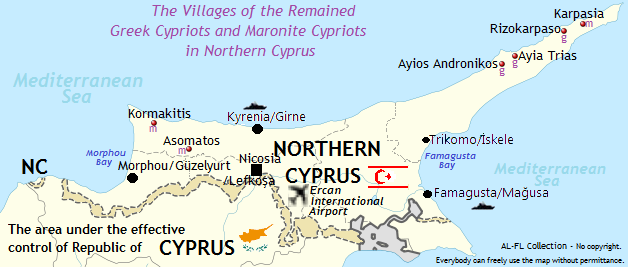
Locations of the remaining predominantly Orthodox Greek Cypriots and Catholic Maronite Cypriots in Northern Cyprus.

=== Orthodoxy ===
Orthodox Christians in Northern Cyprus make up 0.5% of the population. The Greek Cypriots are members of the Autocephalous Greek Orthodox Church of Cyprus (Church of Cyprus). In addition to the Orthodox Christian and Sunni Muslim communities, there is also small Maronite (Eastern Rites Catholic) community.

In Northern Cyprus are the historical churches of Notre Dame de Tyre in Nicosia (1308) and Ganchvor in Famagusta (1346).

=== Maronite Church ===
Out of 209,286 Cypriots 1,131 were Maronites in 1891. The Maronites were 2,752 in 1960, in four villages all situated in currently Northern Cyprus. The origin of the Maronite Church is the Levant.

=== Others ===
Turkish Cypriot Protestants and Anglicans are a very small community. The leader and Pastor of the community is Kemal Başaran.Cyprus PIO: Turkish Press and Other Media, 09-08-05 The vast majority are Anglican and use Anglican churches in the Kyrenia area along with the island's British expatriate community.

According to a statement from the Statistics Council, 2021 estimates indicate that there are approximately 1,000 Turkish-speaking Protestants.

== See also ==
- Freedom of religion in Northern Cyprus
- Religion in Cyprus
- Freedom of religion in Cyprus
