= Christianity in Cyprus =

Christianity in Cyprus is the largest religion in the country, making up 78% of the island's population. The largest Christian denomination is the Greek Orthodox Church, while the rest are smaller communities of Anglicans, Roman Catholics, Latin Christians, Maronites, Armenian Apostolics, and Greek Evangelicals.

== The Church of Cyprus ==
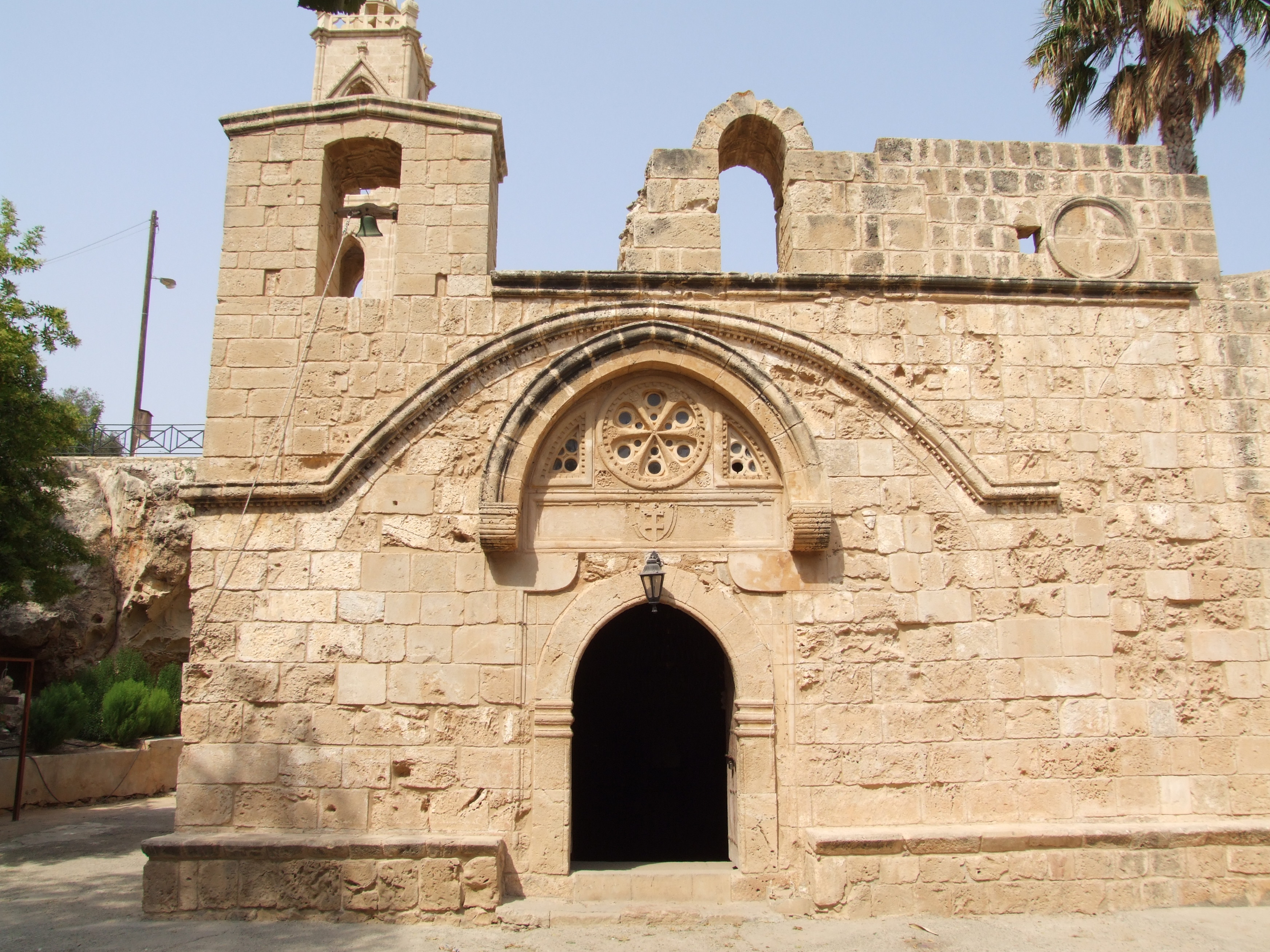
Agia Napa monastery

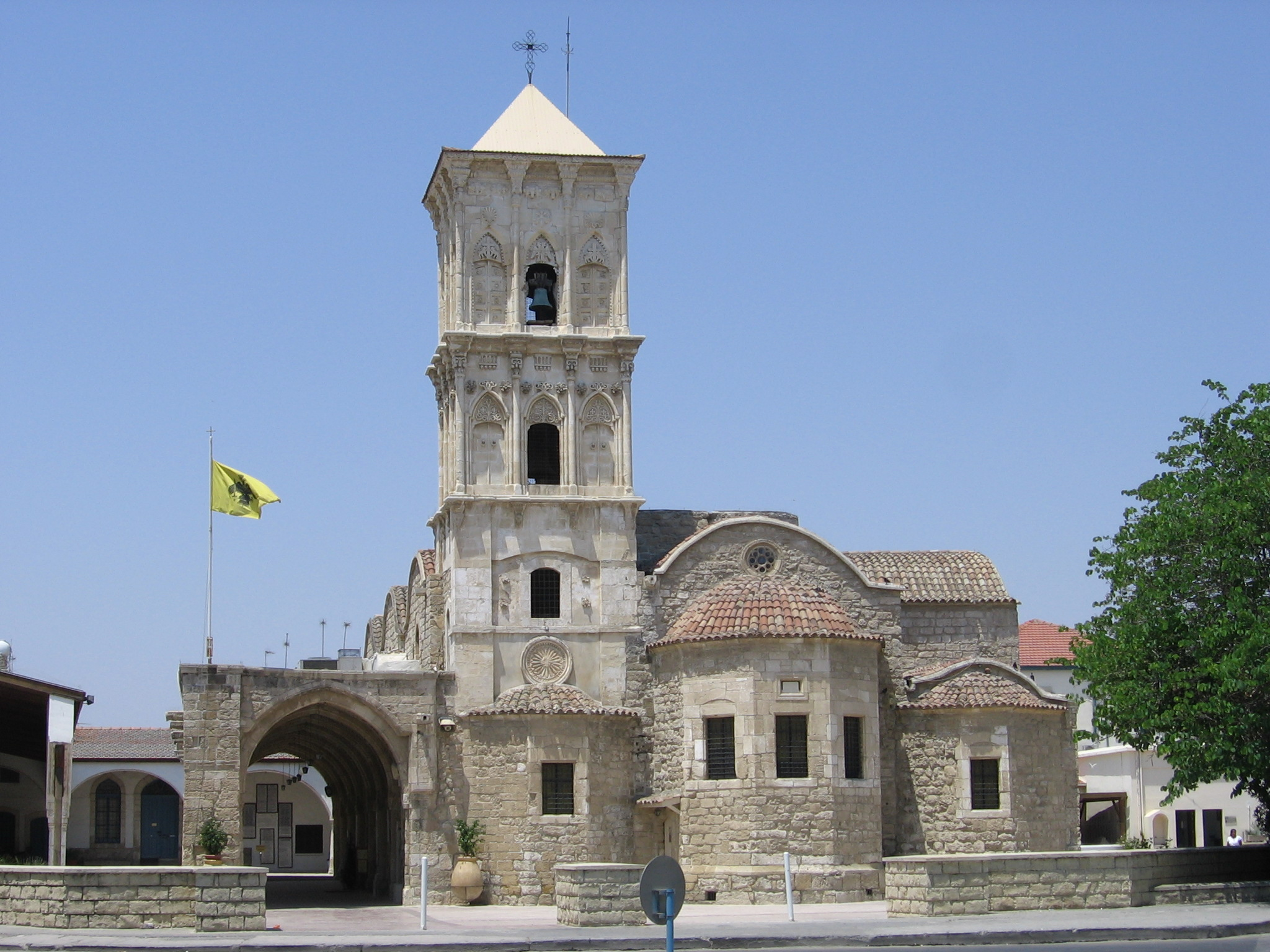
Church of Saint Lazarus, Larnaca

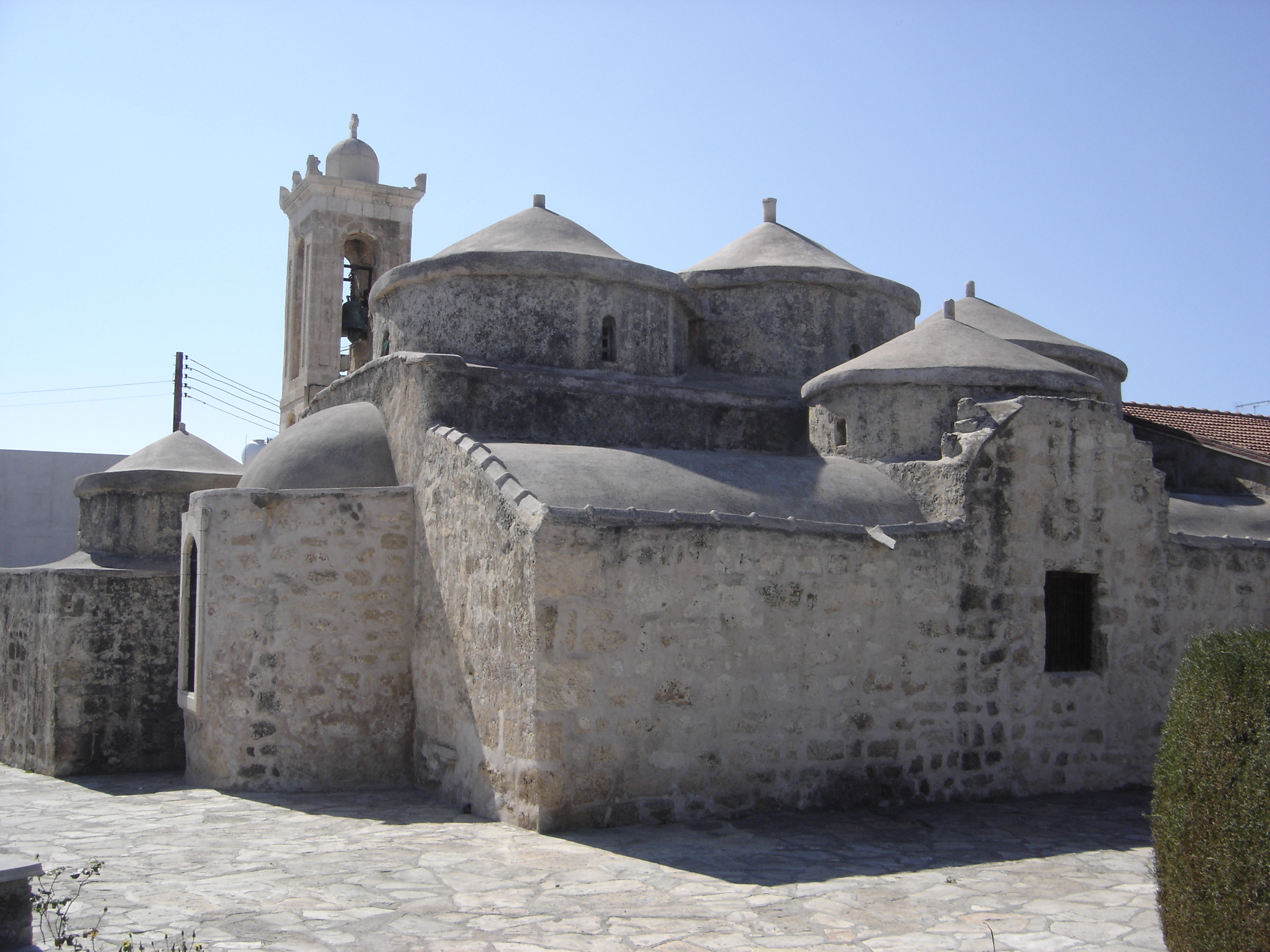
Agia Paraskevi Byzantine church in Yeroskipou

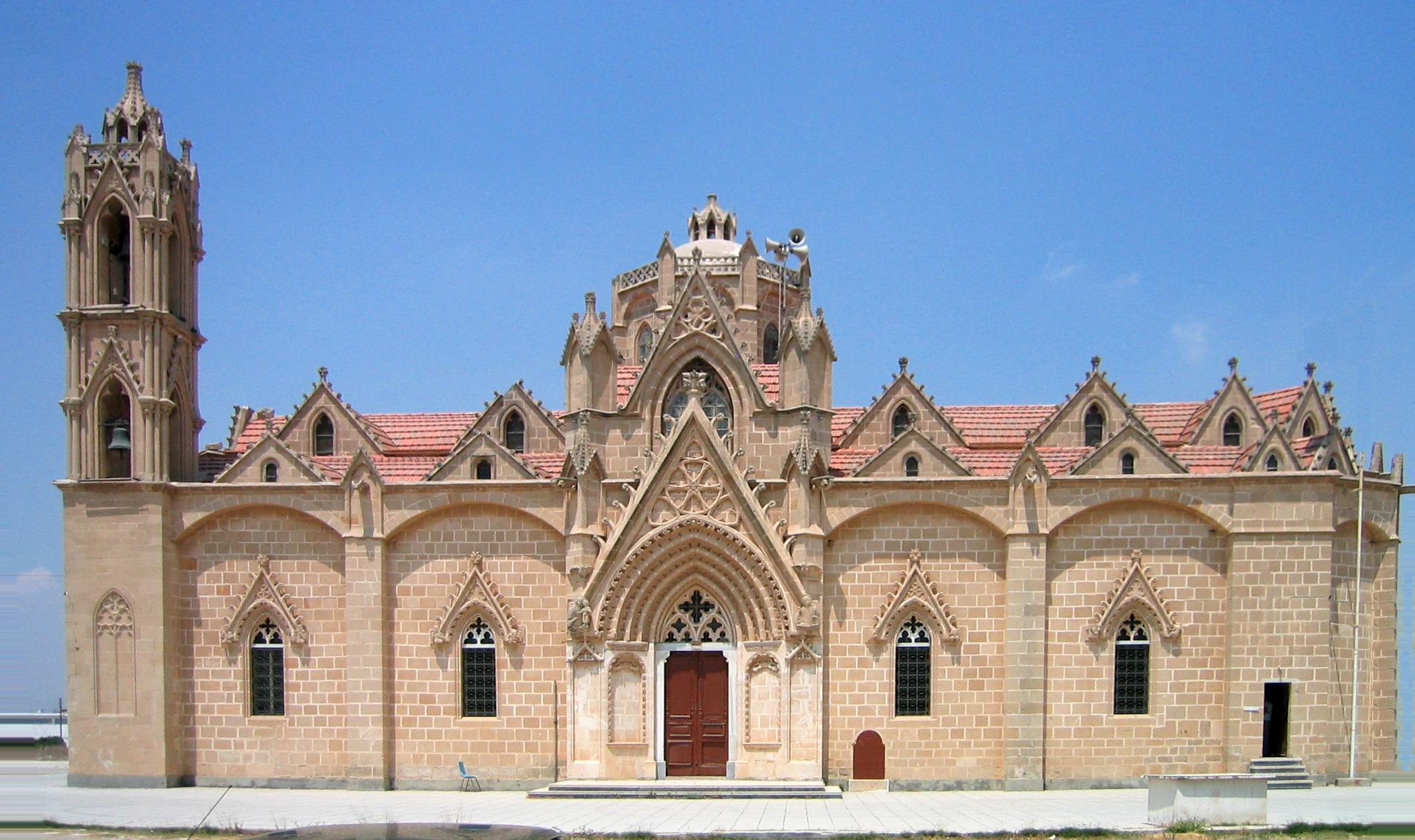
Gothic-style church of Panagia (19th century) at the northern part of the island. Today it functions as a mosque.

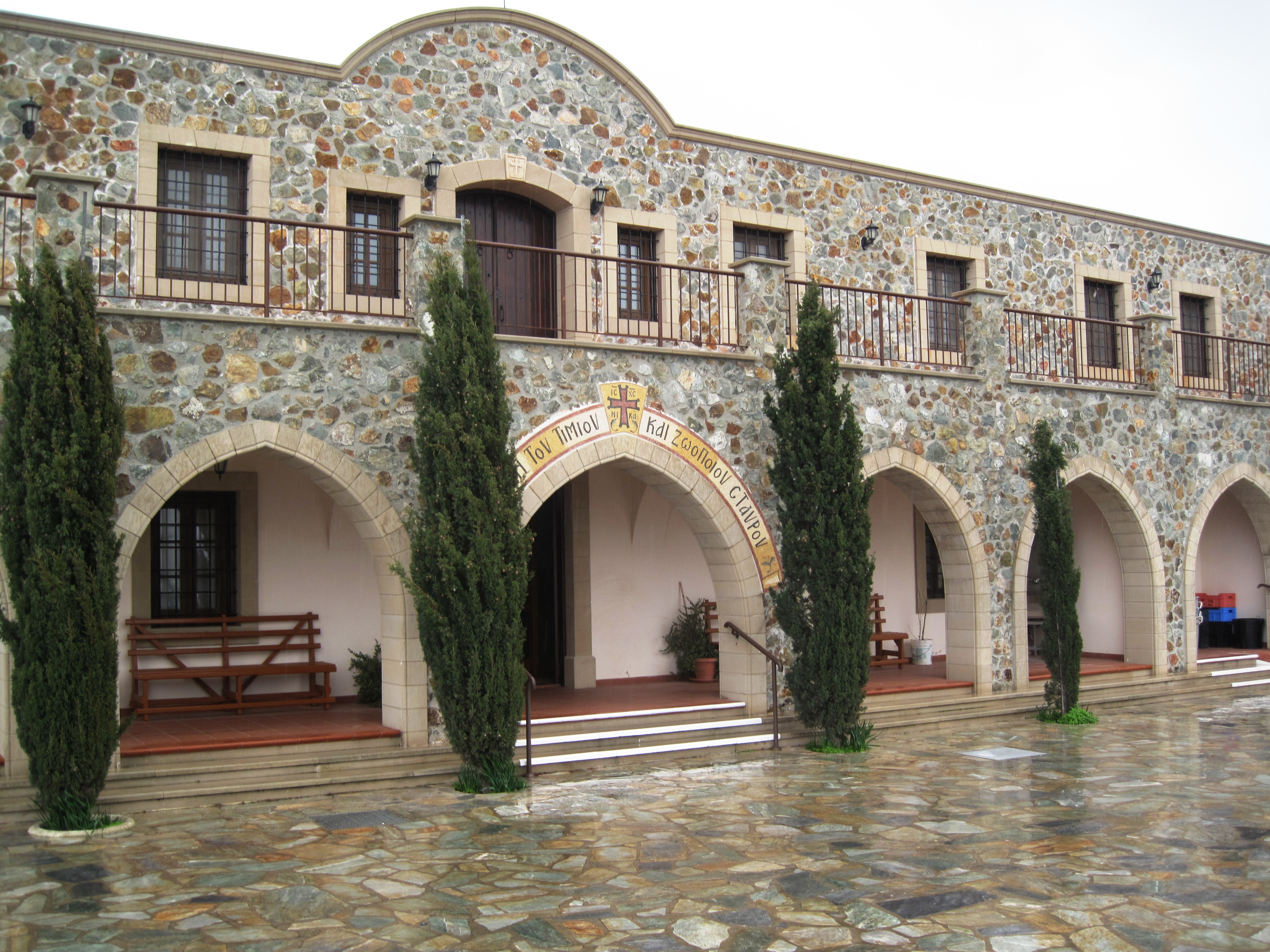
Stavrovouni monastery

The most important church in Cyprus, the Church of Cyprus, is an autocephalous Greek Orthodox Church. While recognising the seniority and prestige of the Ecumenical Patriarch in Constantinople, it has enjoyed complete administrative autonomy under its own Archbishop since the 5th century. The Great Schism had major consequences for the Church of Cyprus. Under Lusignan and Venetian rule, the Church of Cyprus was pressured to recognize the authority of the pope. Under the British, there was an attempt to secularize all public institutions, but this move was bitterly opposed by Church authorities, who used the conflict with the colonial administration to gain leadership of the Greek nationalist movement in fighting for independence. At independence (1959–1960), Archbishop Makarios III, was elected president of the republic to hold the post until his death in 1977.

The church had long been composed of four episcopal sees: the archbishopric of Nicosia, and the metropolitanates of Paphos, Kition, and Kyrenia. New metropolitanates were created by Makarios in 1973 for Limassol and Morphou, with a suffragan, or assistant, bishop in Salamis under the archbishop. A bishop had to be a graduate of the Orthodox theological seminary in Greece and be at least thirty years of age. Since Orthodox bishops were sworn to a vow of celibacy and parish clergy were usually married, bishops were recruits from monasteries rather than parish churches. Bishops were not appointed by the archbishop, but, like him, were elected through a system granting representation to laymen, other bishops, abbots, and regular clergy.

Individual churches, monasteries, dioceses, and charitable educational institutions organized by the Church of Cyprus were independent legal persons enjoying such rights and obligations as holding property. In exchange for many church lands acquired by the government, the government assumed responsibility for church salaries. Parish clergy, traditionally married men chosen by their fellow villagers, were sent for brief training before ordination. In the 20th century, modernizers, most notably Archbishop Makarios, were instrumental in strengthening the quality and training of priests at the Cypriot seminary in Nicosia.

The monasteries of Cyprus had always been very important to the Church of Cyprus. By the 20th century many had long lain in ruins, but their properties were among the most important holdings of the church, the island's largest landowner. Although the number of monks decreased in the postwar era, in the early 1990s there were at least ten active monasteries in the government-controlled areas.

In the Orthodox Church, liturgy is to a great extent the center of the church's activity, for Orthodox doctrine emphasizes the mystery of God's grace rather than salvation through works and knowledge. Seven sacraments are recognized: baptism in infancy, followed by confirmation with consecrated oil, penance, the Eucharist, matrimony, ordination, and unction in times of sickness or when near death.

Formal services are lengthy and colorful, with chanting, incense, and elaborate vestments according to the occasion for the presiding priest. The veneration of icons is done often, located on the church's walls and often covered with offerings of the faithful, is highly developed. Easter is the focus of the church year, closing the Lenten fasting with an Pascha Easter Eve vigil and procession. Marriage is a highly ritualized occasion. Formal divorce proceedings are required for broken engagements that have been ratified by the church. The wedding sponsors play an important role in the family, for they usually act as godparents of all children born of that union.

Religious observance varied. In traditional rural villages, women attended services more frequently than men, and elderly family members were usually responsible for fulfilling religious duties on behalf of the whole family. Church attendance among Greek Cypriots is relatively high, making the Republic of Cyprus one of the most religious countries in the European Union, along with Malta, Greece and Poland. For much of the population, religion centered on prayer at home, veneration of icons, and observance of certain feast days of the Orthodox calendar.

== Oriental Orthodoxy in Cyprus ==
Throughout history, Oriental Orthodox Christianity was represented in Cyprus by Armenian, Syriac and Coptic communities.

=== Armenian Apostolic Church in Cyprus ===
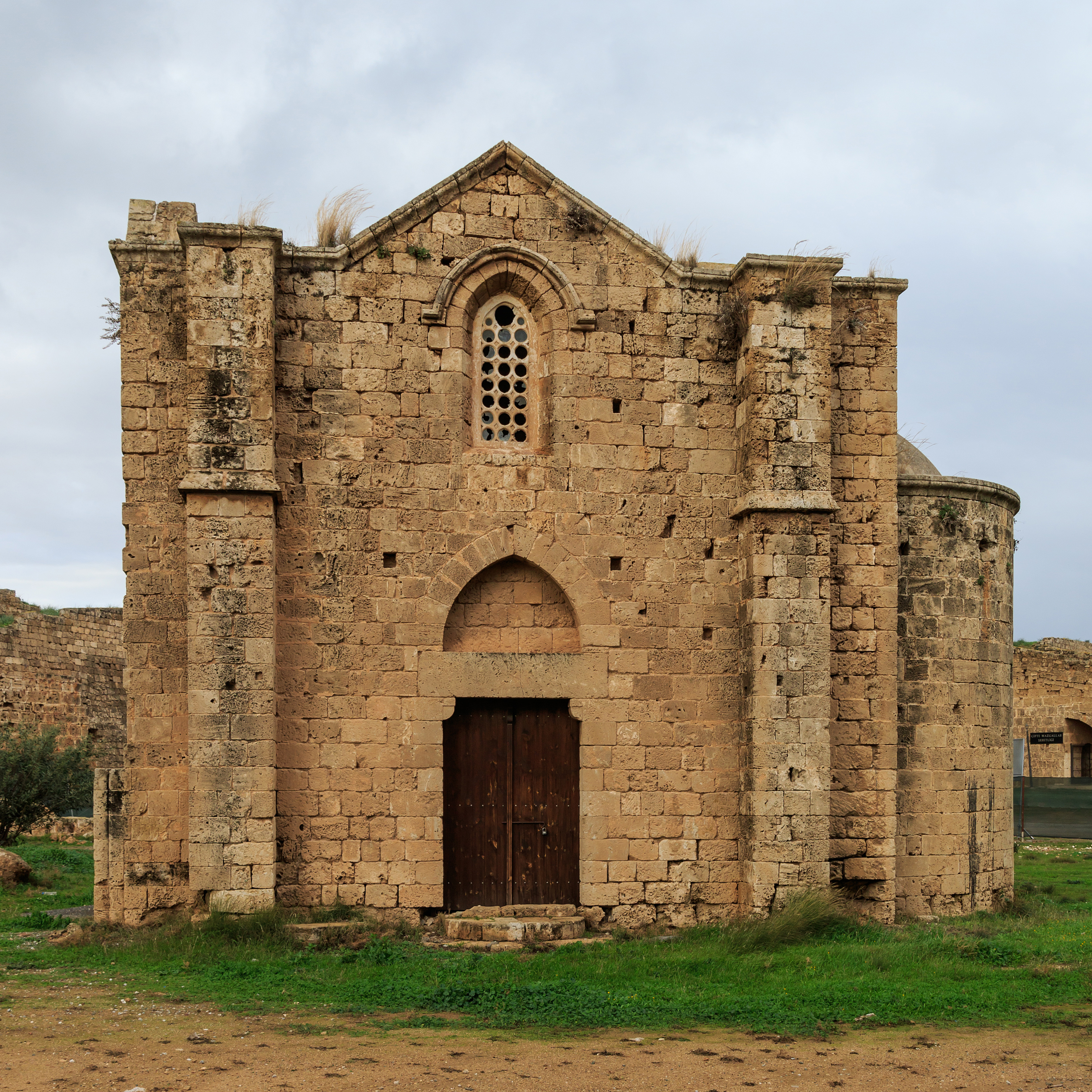
Ganchvor Monastery

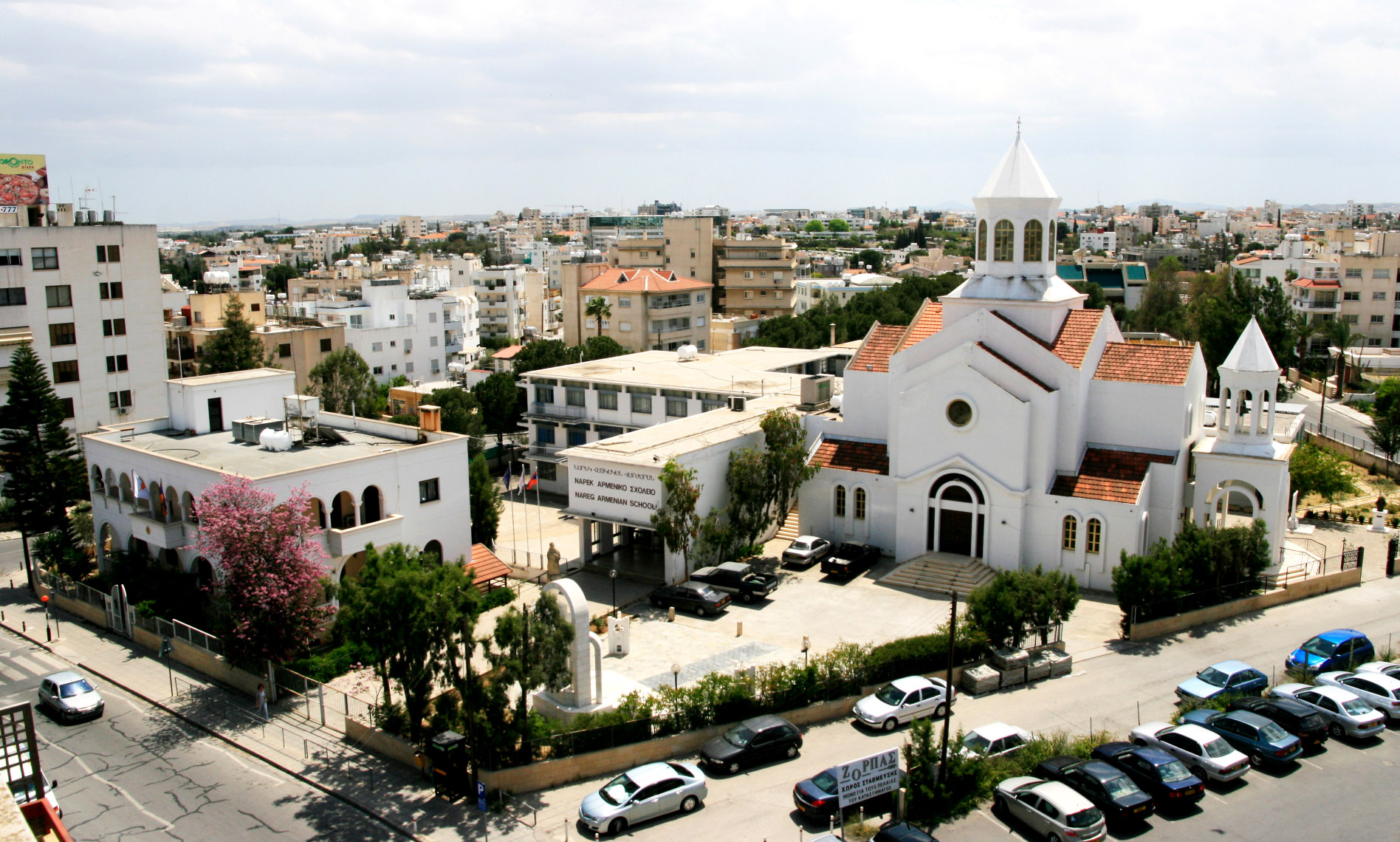
The Armenian compound in Nicosia, featuring the Sourp Asdvadzadzin church

The presence of Armenians in Cyprus dates back to 578. Currently, Armenian-Cypriots maintain a notable presence of about 4,000 persons, mainly inhabiting the urban areas of Nicosia, Larnaca and Limassol. Recently, some Armenian immigrants have settled Paphos.

The Armenian Prelature of Cyprus has had a continuous presence on the island since its establishment in 973 by Catholicos Khatchig I. This see was abolished in 1571, when the city was captured by the Ottomans. Traditionally, the Prelature has been under the jurisdiction of the Catholicosate of the Great House of Cilicia, while today it is the oldest theme that falls under its jurisdiction. Between the 12th and the 16th centuries, Armenians in Cyprus had a second Bishopric, located in Famagusta. Since 2024, the head of the Armenian Prelature is Archbishop Gomidas Ohanian. The Prelature, which is housed on its own premises on Armenia street, Strovolos, Nicosia, next to Nareg School and the Sourp Asdvadzadzin cathedral, has its own Charter.

The most important pilgrimage site is the Sourp Magar monastery, located near Halevga, on the Turkish-occupied Pentadaktylos mountain range. The monastery was established c. 1000 and by 1425 it had passed into Armenian hands. Due to the 1974 Turkish invasion, the monastery has been abandoned and it is presently in a ruinous condition. By initiative of the Armenian MP Vartkes Mahdessian and the Armenian Ethnarchy, annual visits-pilgrimages were organised in 2007 and between 2009-2016; however, no Liturgy has been held since 1974.

Also in Turkish-occupied Cyprus are the historical churches of Notre Dame de Tyre in Nicosia (1308) and Ganchvor in Famagusta (1346). These two churches were abandoned by the Armenians in 1963, after the Cyprus crisis of 1963–64. They were both restored in the 2010s.

In the government-controlled areas of Cyprus, there is the cathedral of the Virgin Mary in Nicosia (1981), the church of Saint Stephen in Larnaca (1909) and the church of Saint George in Limassol (1939). In the Nicosia cathedral and in Larnaca, Liturgies are held every Sunday, while in Limassol Liturgies are held three Sundays a month, as on the fourth Sunday a Liturgy is held in Paphos.

In the vicinity of Nicosia there is also the chapel of Saint Paul (1892), the chapel of the Holy Resurrection (1938) and the chapel of the Saviour of All (1995-1997).

=== Syriac Orthodox Church in Cyprus ===
Cypriot Diocese of the Syriac Orthodox Church of Antioch was established in the thirteenth century, for Syriac refugees from the Levant and merchants from the Mosul region. The Syriac Orthodox Diocese of Cyprus existed until the seventeenth century.

== Catholic Church ==
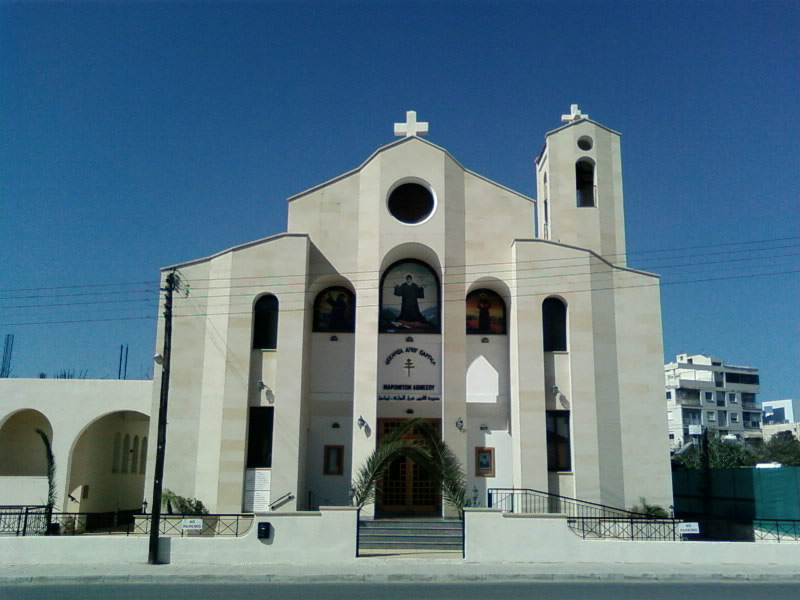
St.Charbel Maronite Catholic Church, Limassol

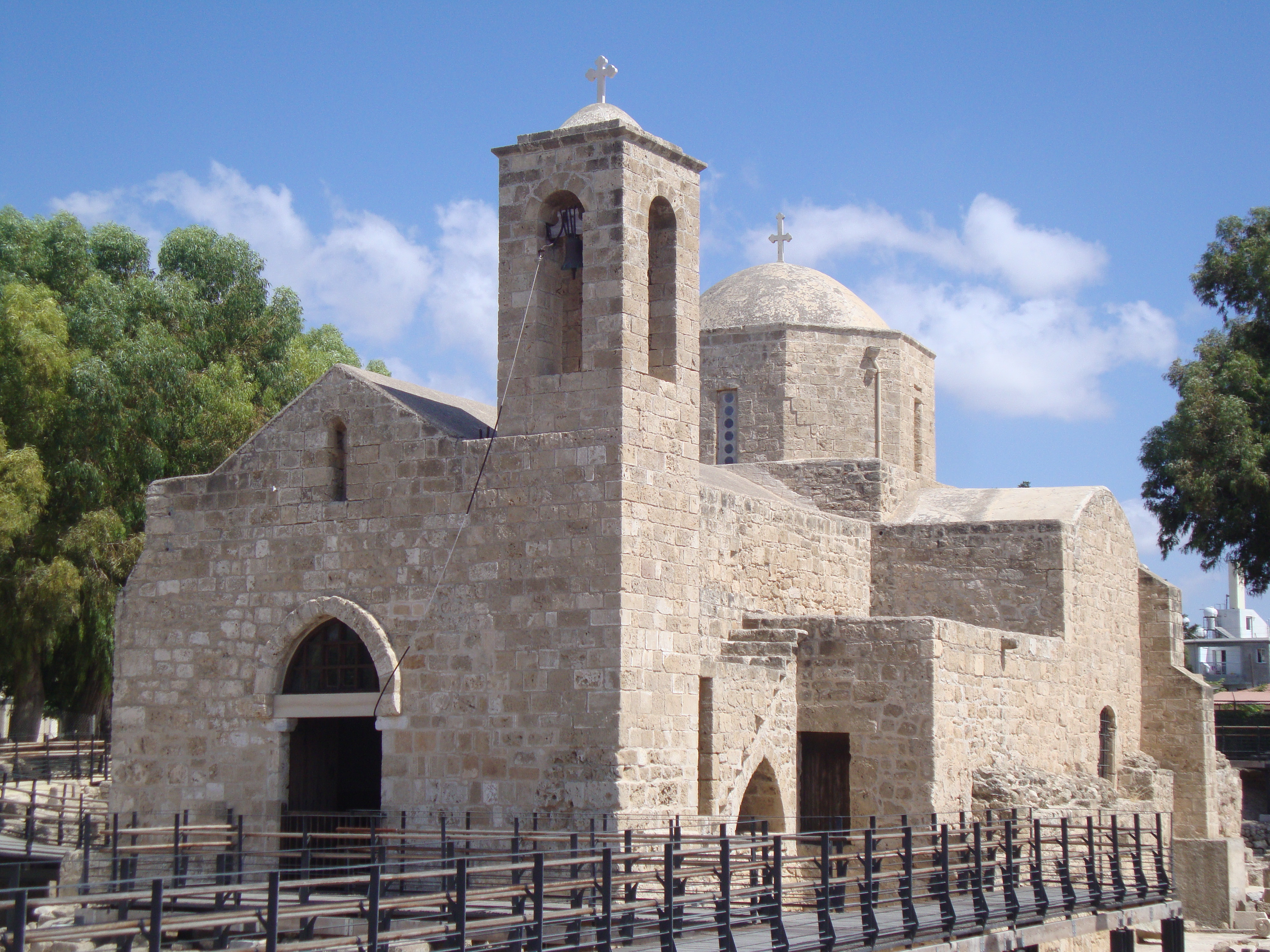
The Catholic Chrysopolitissa Church, Paphos

The Catholic Church in Cyprus is part of the worldwide Catholic Church under the spiritual leadership of the Pope in Rome. There are around 10,000 Catholics in Cyprus, corresponding to just over 1% of the population.

Most Catholics in Cyprus are Maronites (Eastern Rite Catholics). In the 1891 census, out of 209,286 Cypriots 1,131 were Maronites. In the 1960 census they were 2,752, in four villages all situated in the north of the island. Their present estimated population is about 6,000, of whom 150 live in the North.

Latin Rite Catholics of the Catholic Church in Cyprus are under the Latin Patriarch of Jerusalem, as the Latin Patriarchal Vicariate for Cyprus organised.

=== Visions of Anne Catherine Emmerich ===
According to the private revelations attributed to Anne Catherine Emmerich, Jesus undertook a missionary journey to Cyprus that is not recorded in scripture. Emmerich related that the island was small and that neither this visit nor the later missionary work of Paul and Barnabas there was mentioned in the biblical account. During his time on the island, Jesus is said to have converted approximately 570 Jews and pagans to the faith.

Among those who followed him was a woman named Mercuria, together with her children. Emmerich described Mercuria as a former sinner of considerable wealth, possessing extensive property and financial resources. After accompanying Jesus, she joined the holy women and later contributed generously to the first Christian communities established between Ophel and Bethany under the care of the deacons, helping to finance the construction of buildings and provide support for the Christian brethren.

Emmerich further stated that, following Jesus's departure from Cyprus, many Jewish and pagan converts relocated to Palestine, bringing with them their money, valuables, and other possessions, eventually transferring much of their wealth there. Their departure provoked resentment among relatives who had not embraced Jesus's teaching, who believed they had been wronged and ridiculed Jesus as an impostor. According to the visions, Jews and pagans united in opposition to the new faith, treating even the mention of Jesus as a criminal offence. Many Christians were arrested, scourged, and persecuted, while pagan priests compelled members of their own religion to continue offering sacrifices.

The visions also recount that the Roman commandant who had met Jesus was recalled to Rome and removed from office. In an effort to prevent further departures from Cyprus, Roman soldiers were reportedly stationed at the island’s ports so that no one could leave. Although the soldiers remained only for a limited time, they took several inhabitants with them when they departed.

Emmerich additionally related that Mercuria was later martyred during an uprising against the Christians before the conversion of Saul, placing her death around the time Saul departed for Damascus.

== Protestantism ==
After the arrival of the British, the Anglican Church of Cyprus was established in 1878. As of 1976, it falls under the Diocese of Cyprus and the Gulf (https://www.cypgulf.org), whose current bishop is the Right Reverend Sean Semple. Protestants, who include those of the Anglican tradition, amount to 2.00% of the population, according to the official 2011 census. The Anglican cathedral in Nicosia is dedicated to St Paul, with other churches in Limassol (St Barnabas) and Larnaca (St Helena). In Paphos Anglicans worship in Ayia Kyriaki church in Kato Paphos, St Luke's church in Polis and St Stephen's church in Tala; and in south-east Cyprus they worship in the Scandinavian Church in Ayia Napa (Christ Church) and St Fanourios in Deryneia. Anglican worship is also conducted in the Church of St Andrew, Kyrenia, and St Mark Famagusta.

With regard to Northern Cyprus, Turkish Cypriot Protestants are a very small community. The community numbers around five hundred and can be found living throughout northern Cyprus. The leader and Pastor of the community is Kemal Başaran. Despite the general tolerance of the native Turkish Cypriot community, the community faces threats and sometimes attacks at the hands of mainland Turkish settlers and by island nationalists.

== See also ==
- Religion in Cyprus

== Sources ==
- Coureas, Nicholas (2019). "The Syrian Melkites of the Lusignan Kingdom of Cyprus (1192-1474)". Chronos: Revue d'Histoire de l'Université de Balamand. 40: 75–94. Archived from the original on 2021-01-28.
- Kiminas, Demetrius (2009). The Ecumenical Patriarchate: A History of Its Metropolitanates with Annotated Hierarch Catalogs. Wildside Press LLC. ISBN 9781434458766.
- Meyendorff, John (1989). Imperial unity and Christian divisions: The Church 450-680 A.D. Crestwood, NY: St. Vladimir's Seminary Press. ISBN 9780881410563.
- Morroni, Furio: ′′Divina Cypria′′, Discovering the symbols of Christianity in Cyprus. Edited by Rosie Charalambous, Nicosia, Cyprus, 2020, ISBN 978-9963-2451-1-6
- Ostrogorsky, George (1956). History of the Byzantine State. Oxford: Basil Blackwell.
- Roudometof, Victor (2010). "The Transformation of Greek Orthodox Ecclesiastical Institutions in Cyprus, 1878-1931". Chronos: Revue d'Histoire de l'Université de Balamand. 22: 7–23.
