= Archbishop's Palace, Nicosia =

Coordinates: 35.1730°N 33.3675°E

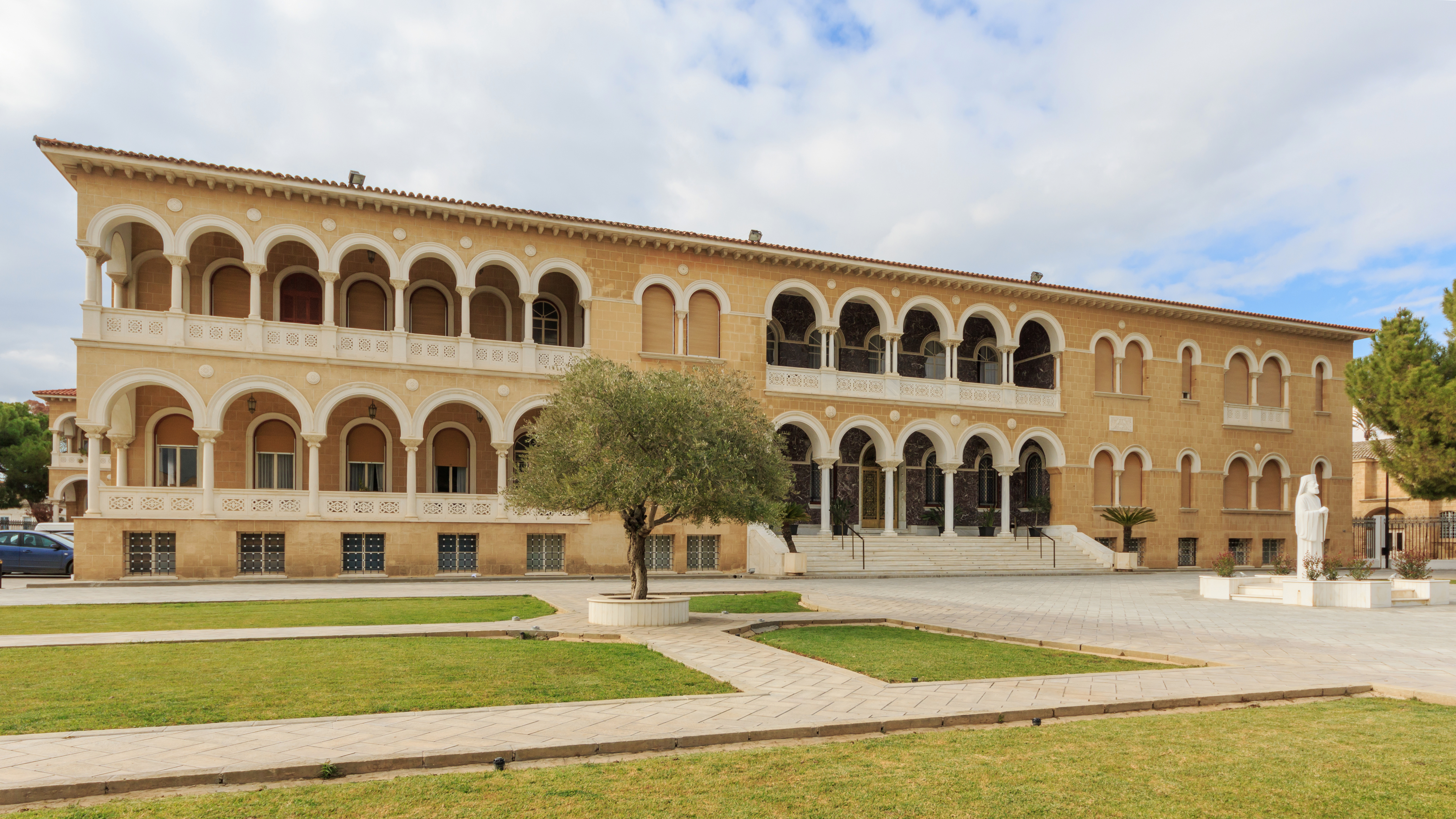

Archbishop's Palace (Greek: Αρχιεπισκοπικό Μέγαρο, Turkish: Başpiskoposluk Sarayı) is the official residence and office of the archbishop of Cyprus located in Nicosia. The palace was built next to the "Old Archbishop's Palace" (built in the 17th century), between 1956 and 1960 in neo-Byzantine architectural style. Its general plans were designed by George Nomikos in Athens, while Nicholas S. Roussos and John Pericleous from Limassol were responsible for all other architectural work. The bronze sculpture of Makarios III, the first president of Cyprus, was on its grounds but has now been moved the monastery of Kykkos. It was sculpted by Nikolas Kotziamannis, weighs around 13 tons and is approximately 30 feet tall. Although the Archbishop's Palace is not open to the public, the Byzantine Museum, Library of the Archbishopric, Folk Art Museum, and the National Struggle Museum located on its grounds are open to the public.

== See also ==
- List of castles in Cyprus
- Church of Cyprus
- St. John's Cathedral, Nicosia
