= Turkish Cypriot Protestants =

Protestants are a very small community living in the de facto Turkish Republic of Northern Cyprus and amongst the Turkish Cypriot diaspora. Approximately five hundred adherents can be found living throughout northern Cyprus, although the Turkish Speaking Protestant Association estimated in 2021 that there were 1000 Protestants. The leader and pastor of the community is Kemal Başaran.

Protestantism was introduced to Cyprus with the arrival of the British in 1878; as such, the vast majority are British expatriate Anglican and use Anglican churches in the Kyrenia area. Other Christian denominations have a presence, including Baptist and Pentecostal churches.

In recent years, the community have asked for their own church building. Despite the general tolerance of the native Turkish Cypriot community, the community faces threats and sometimes attacks at the hands of mainland Turkish settlers and by island nationalists. In an interview with Havadis Gazette in 2019, Pastor Başaran said: "The Turkish Cypriots who belong to various religions in our country want to live freely with their religions. The Turkish Cypriots, the Bulgarian Turks and the Turks from Turkey, who are Protestants and consist of approximately 200 families, demand a church where they would be able to practise freely their worship."

== See also ==
- Religion in Cyprus
- Freedom of religion in Northern Cyprus
