= Religion in Cyprus =

Religion in government-controlled area of Cyprus, 2021
1. Eastern Orthodoxy (74.5%)
2. Catholicism (1.50%)
3. Protestantism (1.75%)
4. Islam (2.12%)
5. Buddhism (0.85%)
6. Sikhism (0.24%)
7. Other religions (0.67%)
8. No religion (1.04%)
9. Religion not stated (17.3%)
Religion on the entire isle of Cyprus (including the Turkish Republic of Northern Cyprus), 2010 Pew estimate
1. Christianity (73.2%)
2. Islam (25.3%)
3. Unafilliated (1.20%)
4. Other (0.30%)

Religion in Cyprus is dominated by the Eastern Orthodox branch of Christianity, whose adherents make up 73% of the total population of the entire island. Most Greek Cypriots are members of the autocephalous Greek Orthodox 'Church of Cyprus'. Most Turkish Cypriots are officially Sunni Muslims. There are also Armenian Apostolic, Catholic, Protestant (including Anglican), Jewish, Baháʼí, Sikh and non-religious communities in Cyprus.

Religious statistics for Cyprus vary depending on whether they refer to the government-controlled area of the Republic of Cyprus or the island as a whole, including the Turkish Cypriot-administered north. The Republic of Cyprus census records religion in the government-controlled area, while international estimates such as those from the Pew Research Center attempt to describe the religious composition of the entire island.

== Statistics ==
Religion in government-controlled territories of Cyprus (2011 and 2021 Census)
Religion	Citizens 2011		All inhabitants 2011		Citizens 2021		All inhabitants 2021	
Religion	Adherents	%	Adherents	%	Adherents	%	Adherents	%
Christian Orthodox	650,215	97.43	748,610	89.08	604,165	84.00%	688,075	74.52%
Roman Catholic	2,267	0.34	24,460	2.91	2,073	0.29%	13,860	1.50%
Anglican/Protestant	1,387	0.21	16,974	2.02	792	0.11%	9,621	1.04%
Maronite Church	3,656	0.55	3,800	0.45	4,169	0.58	4,486	0.49%
Armenian Church	1,803	0.27	2,453	0.29	1,684	0.23%	2,025	0.22%
Muslim	2,492	0.37	15,279	1.82	3,242	0.45	19,534	2.12%
Buddhist	73	0.01	8,453	1.01	240	0.03	7,868	0.85%
Sikh					31	<0.01%	2,260	0.24%
Hindu	27	<0.01	1,528	0.18	46	<0.01	1,681	0.18%
Other religion	1,829	0.27	4,112	0.49	1,514	0.21%	4,545	0.49%
Atheist/no religion	1,062	0.16	5,357	0.64	2,651	0.37%	9,591	1.04%
Not stated	2,587	0.39	9,381	1.12	98,645	13.71	159,835	17.31%
Total	667,398	100.00	840,407	100.00	719,252	100.00	923,381	100.00

The 2021 census recorded Eastern Orthodox Christianity as the largest religious affiliation in the government-controlled area, accounting for 74.5% of all inhabitants. The proportion of respondents whose religion was not stated increased to 17.3%, compared with 1.1% in 2011. Several minority religions represented a larger share of all inhabitants than of Cypriot citizens, reflecting the effect of non-citizen residents on the religious composition recorded by the census.

Religion on the isle of Cyprus (2010, Pew estimate)
Religion	Adherents	%
Christians	810,000	73.2
Muslims	280,000	25.3
Unaffiliated	10,000	1.2
Hindus	<10k	<.01
Buddhists	<10k	<.01
Jews	<10k	<.01
Other Religions	<10k	<.01
Total	1,100,000	100.00

== Christianity ==
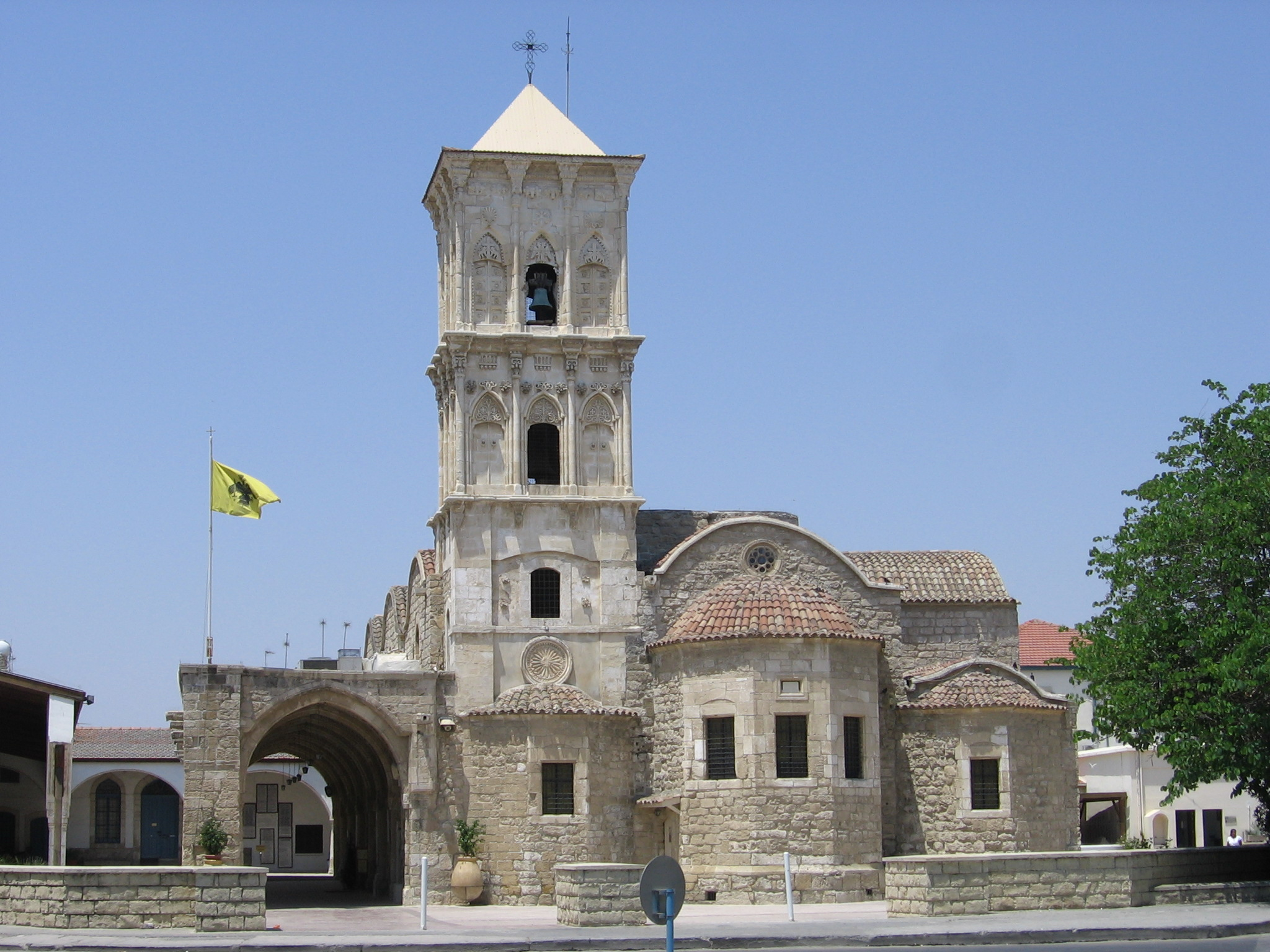
Church of Saint Lazarus, Larnaca

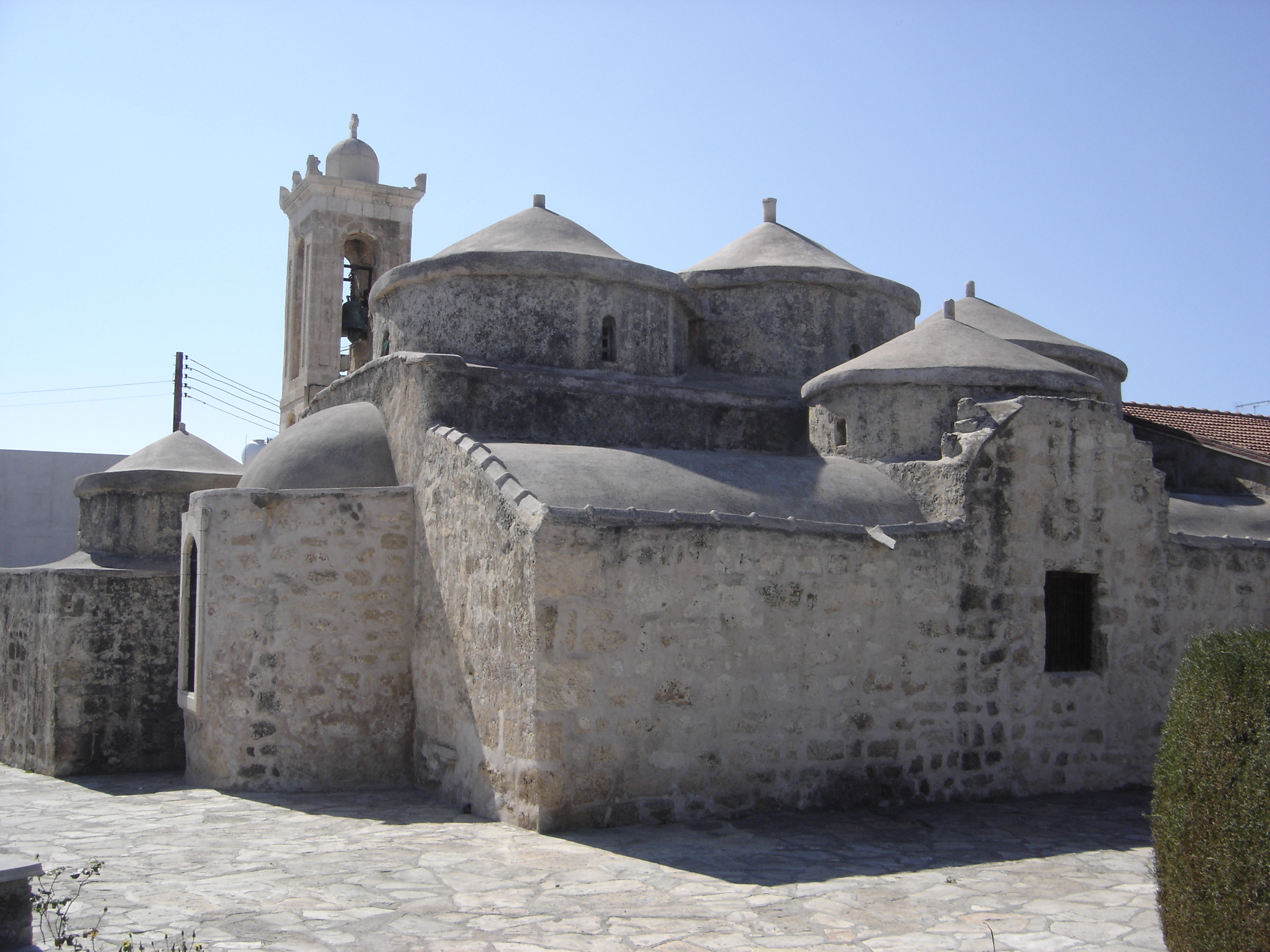
Agia Paraskevi Byzantine church in Yeroskipou

Cyprus is a place where many New Testament biblical stories took place, mainly told in the Book of Acts, a few years after the Crucifixion of Jesus.

According to tradition, the first bishops in Cyprus were the apostles Lazarus (see Church of Saint Lazarus, Larnaca) and Barnabas, the latter of whom is identified by the Book of Acts as a Cypriot Jew. (Note: Acts 4:36) The same book names Cyprus as a destination for many early Christians fleeing persecution. (Note: Acts 11:19)

=== Greek Orthodox Church of Cyprus ===
The largest and most important church in Cyprus, the Church of Cyprus, is an autocephalous Greek Orthodox Church within the Orthodox tradition using the Greek liturgy. It is one of the oldest Eastern Orthodox autocephalous churches, having achieved independence from the Patriarchate of Antioch in 431 AD.

The Church of Cyprus recognises the seniority and prestige of the ecumenical patriarch of Constantinople, while retaining complete administrative autonomy under its own archbishop. Seven sacraments are recognised: baptism in infancy, followed by confirmation with consecrated oil, penance, the Eucharist, matrimony, ordination, and unction in times of sickness or when near death.

Many examples of classical Christian architecture are located in Cyprus, along with tombs said to belong to Lazarus and Barnabas.

=== Armenian Church in Cyprus ===
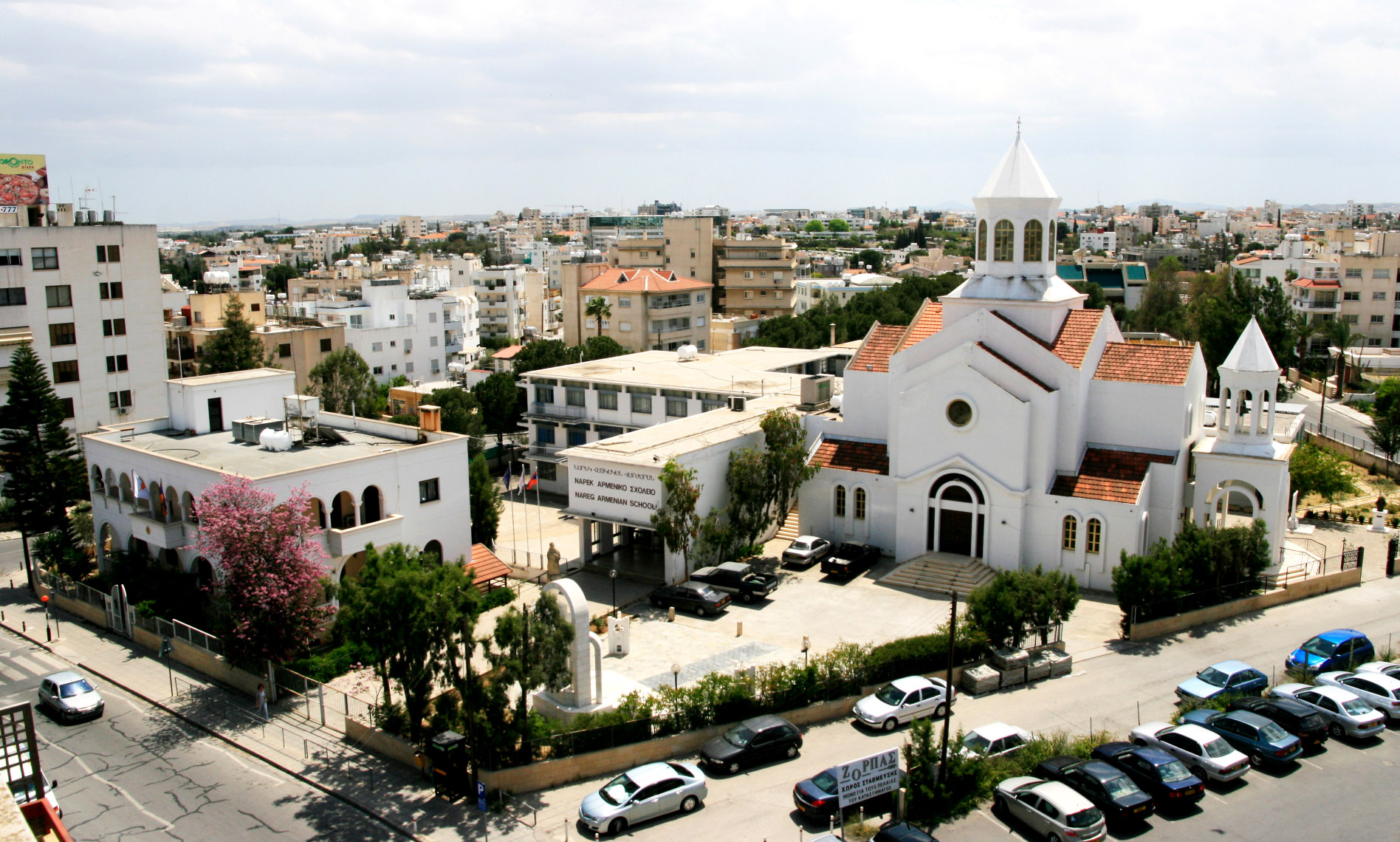
The Armenian compound in Nicosia, featuring the Sourp Asdvadzadzin church

The presence of Armenians in Cyprus dates back to 578. Currently, Armenian-Cypriots maintain a notable presence of about 3,500 persons, mainly inhabiting the urban areas of Nicosia, Larnaca, and Limassol. Recently, some Armenian immigrants have settled Paphos.

The Armenian Prelature of Cyprus has had a continuous presence on the island since its establishment in 973 by Catholicos Khatchig I.

Armenians are one of the most constitutionally recognized religious groups of Cyprus, alongside Maronites and Latins. In the 2021 census of the government-controlled area, 2,025 inhabitants were recorded as belonging to the Armenian Church, including 1,684 Cypriot citizens.

=== Catholicism ===
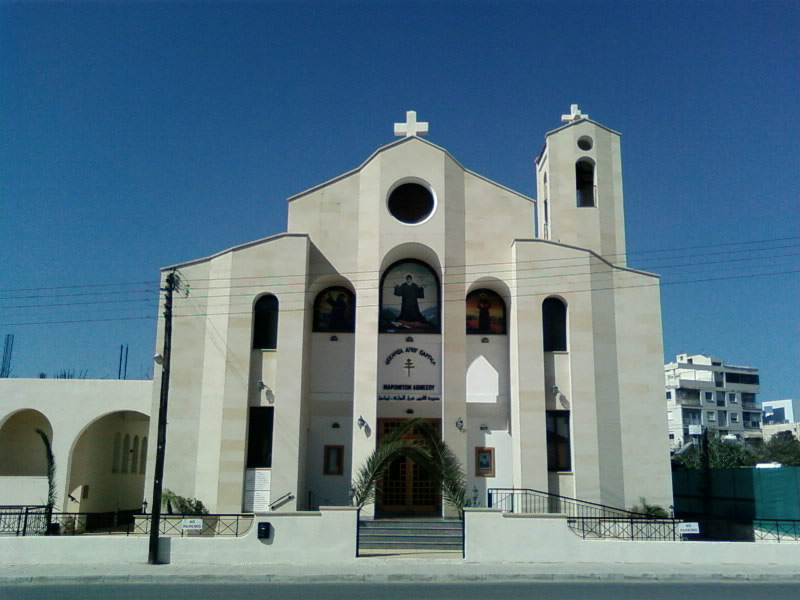
St.Charbel Maronite Catholic Church, Limassol

The Catholic Church in Cyprus is part of the worldwide Catholic Church under the spiritual leadership of the Pope in Rome. According to the 2011 census, Catholics made up 2.9% of the population.

A minority of Catholics in Cyprus are Maronites (adherents of one of the Eastern Rite Catholics). According to the 1891 census, of the 209,286 Cypriots counted, 1,131 were Maronites. By 2023, there were 5000 Maronites on the island.

=== Protestantism ===
According to the 2011 census, Protestants made up 2% of the population of the government-controlled area.

The Church of England established a presence in Cyprus at the advent of the protectorate itself in 1878, initially under the Diocese of Gibraltar. In 1976, the Cypriot portion of the church became the Archdeaconry of Cyprus, within the Diocese of Cyprus and the Gulf. As of 2024, the jurisdiction is headed by Archdeacon Ven Christopher Futcher.

Northern Cyprus is home to a Turkish Protestant minority; the Turkish-Speaking Protestant Association (TPSA) estimates the community's numbers to be 1,000. According to the TPSA, Protestants are under continual surveillance by North Cypriot police.

== Islam ==
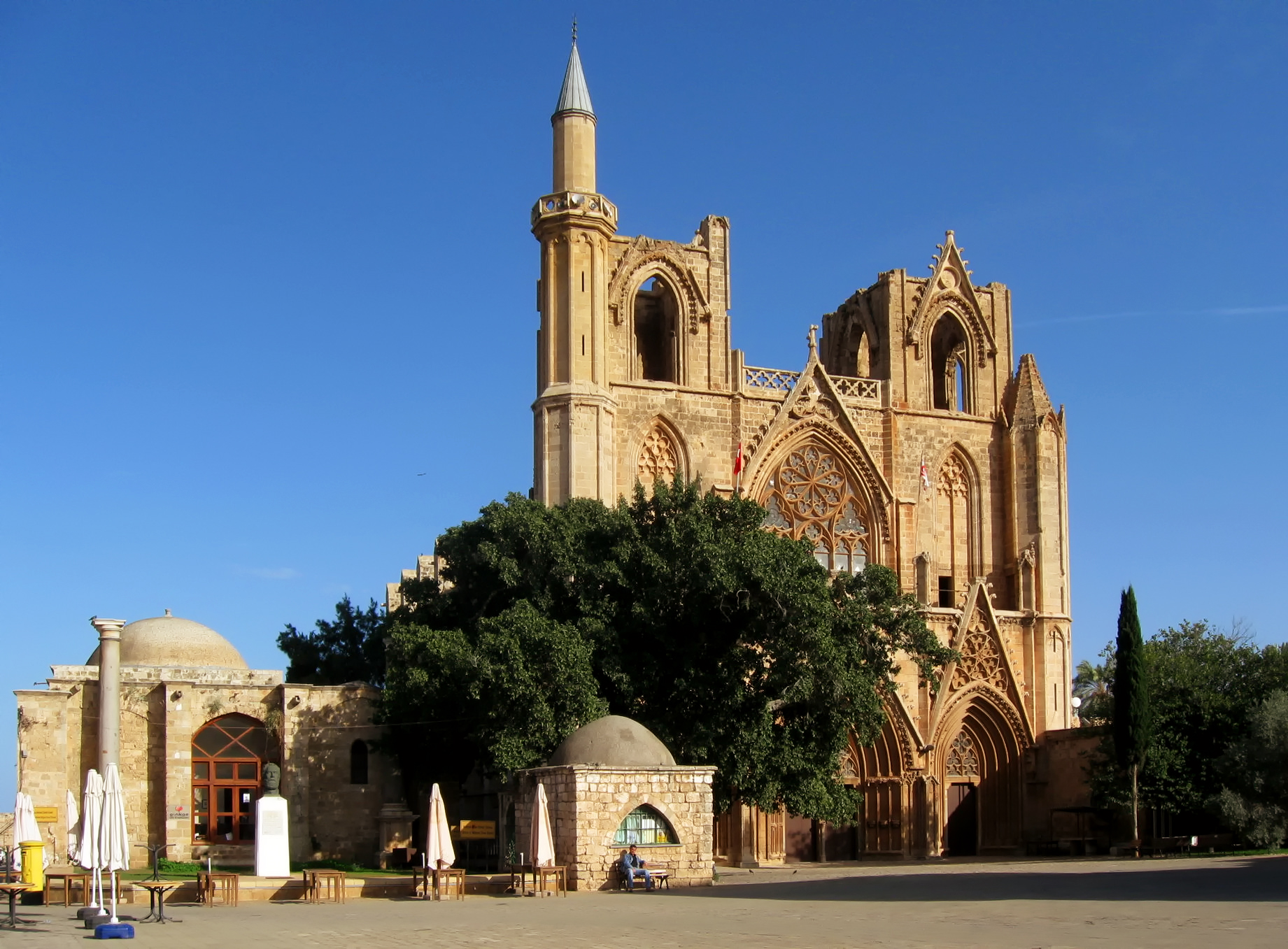
Lala Mustafa Pasha Mosque in Famagusta

In 2022 Muslims made up about 1.8% of the population of the government-controlled area. They make up approximately 25% of the population of the entire island. The island was conquered by the Ottoman General Lala Mustafa Pasha from the Venetians in 1570. From then until 1878, mainland Turks came to Cyprus as soldiers and administrators. Turkish Cypriots mainly adhere to the Sunni branch of Islam.

Sufism also plays an important role. Historically, Muslims were spread over the whole of Cyprus, but since the Turkish invasion in 1974 they have lived primarily in the north. Within the north there is also a small Ahmadi community.

Several important Islamic shrines and landmarks exist on the island, including:

- The Arabahmet Mosque in Nicosia (built in the 16th century)
- The Hala Sultan Tekke/Umm Haram Mosque in Larnaca (built in the 18th century)

== Sikhism ==
There are about 13,280 or 1.1% Sikhs in Cyprus in 2021.

== Buddhism ==
Buddhism in Cyprus is largely associated with non-citizen resident communities. In the 2021 census, 7,868 inhabitants in the government-controlled area were recorded as Buddhist, compared with 240 Cypriot citizens. This represents 0.85% of all inhabitants in the government-controlled area.

== Judaism ==
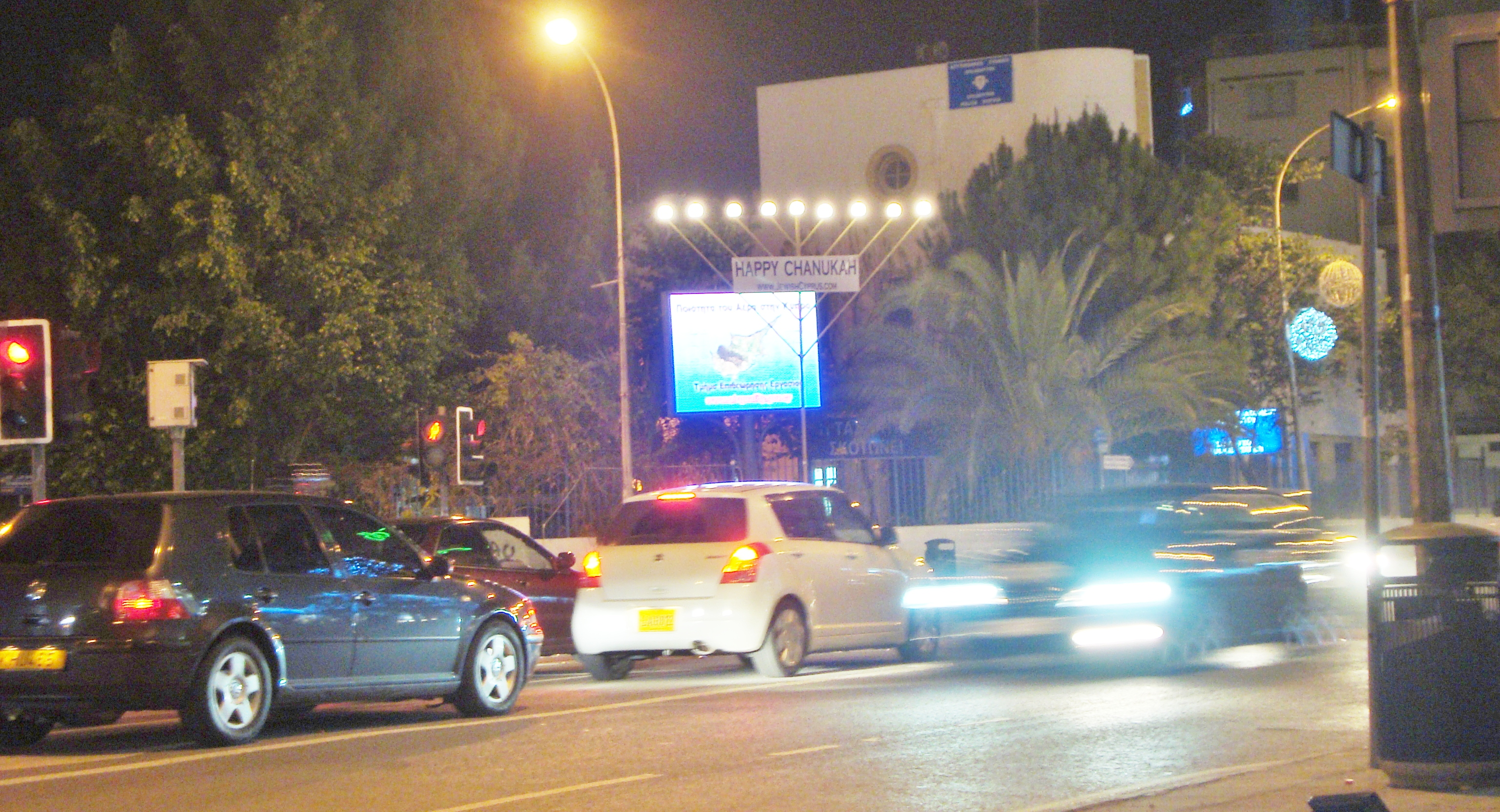
Public menorah in Nicosia

Jewish presence in Cyprus dates back to the 3rd century BC, after settling on the island, they established trade relations with other religious groups. In 2022, there were approximately 6,000 Jewish people on the island, who were either permanent residents or citizens in Cyprus. There are active Synagogues in Larnaca, Limassol, Nicosia, Paphos and Ayia Napa with dedicated Rabbis to each. All religious matters are handled by the Chief Rabbinate of Cyprus, headed by Chief Rabbi Arie Zeev Raskin.

Kyrenia Synagogue (Turkish: Girne Sinagogu) has been in operation since 2008 and affiliated with Chabad movement. The synagogue functions as a Chabad house and the rabbi is the Chaim Hillel Azimov. In 2023 Azimov left Northern Cyprus due to fear of possible antisemitic attacks after the Hamas-Israel war.

== Atheism and irreligion ==
According to a 2011 estimate, in the Greek-Cypriot government-controlled area, 0.6% of the people consider themselves irreligious or atheist. In 2018, the Cyprus Humanist Association accused Cyprus' Ministry of Education of discrimination against atheists by promoting anti-atheist educational material through its official website. During the 37th session of the United Nations Human Rights Council, the International Humanist Union listed Cyprus in their list of states accused of promoting hatred against atheists and humanists.

It's neither known how many percent of the population are atheists in the Turkish-Cypriot government-controlled area nor how they are treated in the northern part of the island.

In the 2021 census, 9,591 inhabitants in the government-controlled area were recorded as atheist or having no religion, representing 1.04% of all inhabitants. Among Cypriot citizens, 2,651 people, or 0.37%, were recorded in this category. The census also recorded a larger number of people whose religion was not stated.

== Freedom of religion ==
In 2023, the country was scored 4 out of 4 for religious freedom by Freedom House, a U.S. government–affiliated body.

The constitution of the Republic of Cyprus prohibits religious discrimination and protects the freedom to worship, teach and practice religion. It also gives the Church of Cyprus the right to regulate its internal affairs and recognizes the Cyprus Foundations Administration, or Vakf, as the institution responsible for Muslim religious endowments.

== See also ==
- Religion in Northern Cyprus
