= TRNC Directorate of Religious Affairs =

Islamic organization in Northern Cyprus

The TRNC Directorate of Religious Affairs is the institution responsible for carrying out works related to faith, worship and moral principles of Islam; enlightening the society about religion, and managing places of worship in the Turkish Republic of Northern Cyprus. The Directorate of Religious Affairs of the island falls under the umbrella of the Directorate of Religious Affairs of Turkey. The Directorate provides services in the five districts of the TRNC: Nicosia, Famagusta, Girne, Güzelyurt, İskele, as well as Lefke and Republic of Cyprus.

As of 2025, the chairman is Hakan Moral.

In 2022, the directorate appointed and funded all 225 imams at the 210 Sunni mosques in the area; the directorate also approved all sermons for Friday worship.

== See also ==
- Diyanet Center of America
- Religion in Northern Cyprus
