= Church of Cyprus =

Christian Eastern Orthodox jurisdiction in Cyprus

Coordinates: 35.1683°N 33.3362°E

Church of Cyprus
- Εκκλησία της Κύπρου
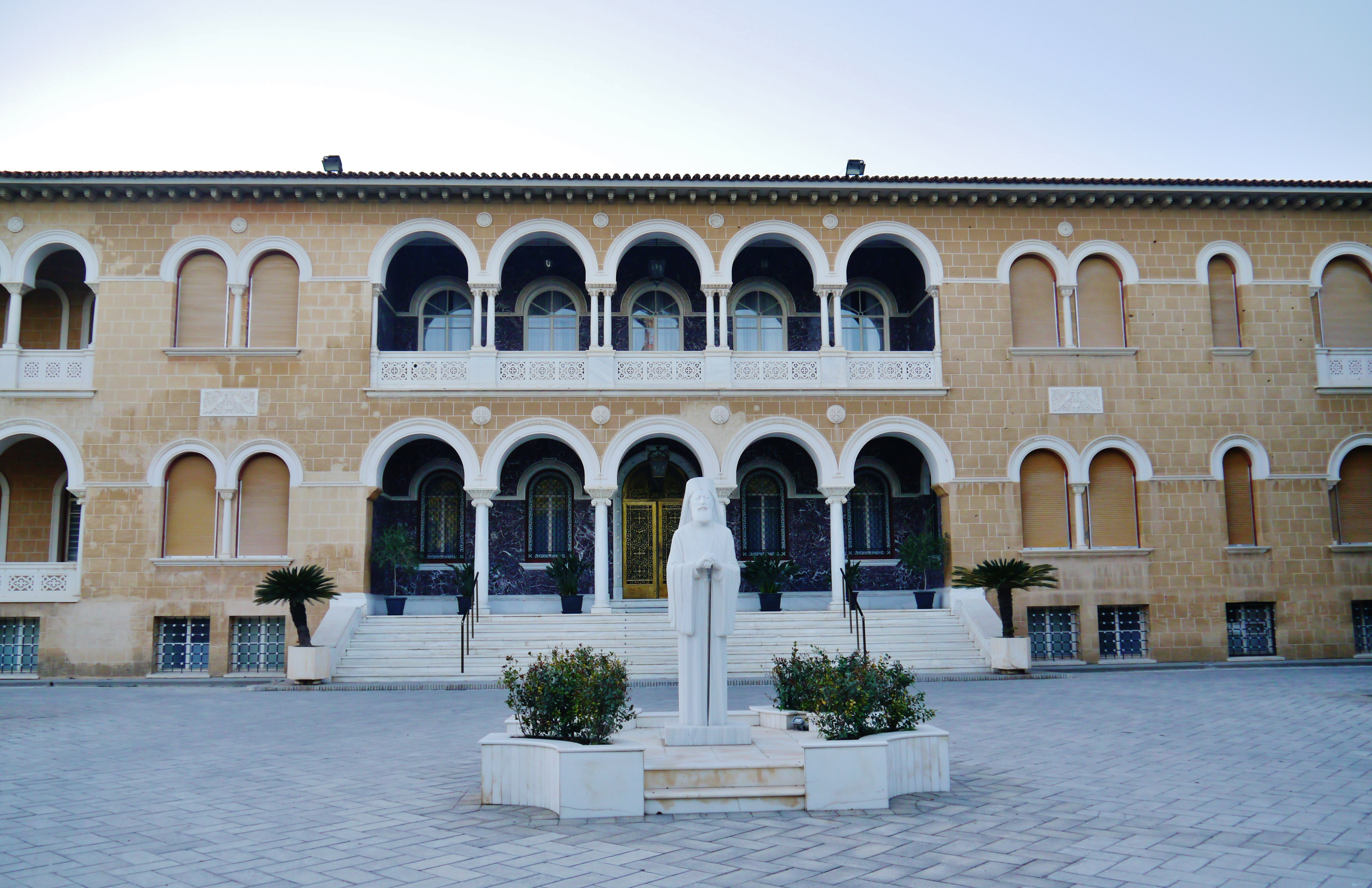
- Archbishop's Palace, Nicosia, headquarters of the Church of Cyprus
- Type: Autocephaly
- Classification: Christian
- Orientation: Greek Orthodox
- Scripture: Septuagint; New Testament
- Theology: Eastern Orthodox theology
- Polity: Episcopal
- Primate: George III
- Monasteries: 67
- Language: Koine Greek
- Headquarters: Nicosia, Cyprus
- Territory: Cyprus
- Founder: Barnabas the Apostle
- Origin: 1st century Roman Cyprus
- Independence: 431 or earlier
- Recognition: 431 (Council of Ephesus); 478 (Roman Empire)
- Members: 688,075
- Official website: www.churchofcyprus.org.cy

The Church of Cyprus (Greek: Ἐκκλησία τῆς Κύπρου, romanized: Ekklisia tis Kyprou), is an autocephalous Greek Orthodox church and one of the churches within the communion of the Eastern Orthodox Church. Based in Cyprus, it is one of the oldest Eastern Orthodox autocephalous churches; it claims to have always been independent, although it may have been subject to the Church of Antioch before its autocephaly was recognized in 431 at the Council of Ephesus. The bishop of the ancient capital, Salamis (renamed Constantia by Emperor Constantius II), was constituted metropolitan by Emperor Zeno, with the title archbishop.

== History ==
=== Roman era ===
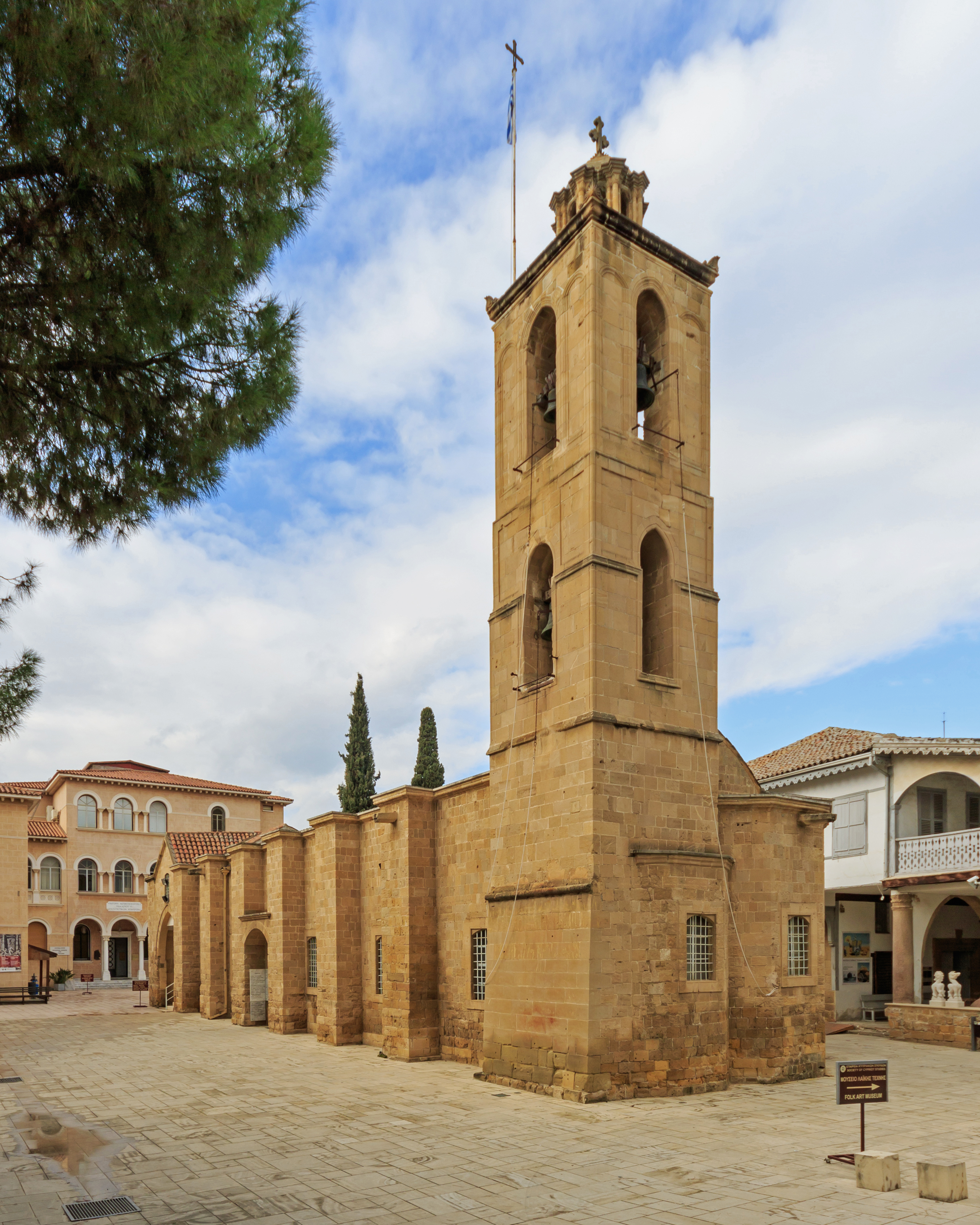
St. John's Cathedral, Nicosia

According to the Acts of the Apostles, Paul the Apostle preached on Cyprus during his first missionary journey and converted the Roman proconsul Sergius Paulus in Paphos (Acts 13:6–12). This event is traditionally regarded as the first recorded conversion of a Roman provincial governor to Christianity, leading later Christian tradition to describe Cyprus as the first territory governed by a Christian ruler.

Several early Christian figures are traditionally associated with the spread of Christianity on the island. Lazarus is venerated as the first Bishop of Kition (modern Larnaca), where he is said to have served for many years after leaving Judea. Other figures associated with the early episcopal organization of the Church of Cyprus include Heraklidios, Bishop of Tamassos, Auxibius, Bishop of Soloi, and Theodotus, Bishop of Kyrenia; however, information about their lives is largely derived from later ecclesiastical tradition rather than contemporary historical sources.

By the end of the fourth century, Christianity had spread throughout Cyprus and become the dominant religion on the island. During this period, Epiphanius of Salamis served as Archbishop of Cyprus. His episcopal seat was located in Salamis, which was later renamed Constantia. Epiphanius played a significant role in the theological debates of the period and was a prominent defender of Nicene orthodoxy.

=== Byzantine era ===
This independent (autocephalous) status of the Church of Cyprus was recognized by ancient custom against the claims of the patriarch of Antioch at the Council of Ephesus in 431. It remains unclear whether the Church of Cyprus had always been independent or had previously been under the Church of Antioch. When the patriarch of Antioch asserted jurisdiction over Cyprus, the Cypriot clergy formally contested this before the Council of Ephesus. The Council ratified the autocephaly of the Church of Cyprus through a resolution stating:

If, as it is asserted in memorials and orally by the religious men who have come before the Council – it has not been a continuous ancient custom for the bishop of Antioch to hold ordinations in Cyprus, – the prelates of Cyprus shall enjoy, free from molestation and violence, their right to perform by themselves the ordination of bishops [for their island].

Following the Council of Ephesus, the Church of Antioch did not renew its claims over Cyprus. Recent scholarship highlights that civil authorities played a key role in the recognition of local autocephaly in the early Church, with the case of Cyprus being a significant early example of this interaction between ecclesiastical custom and imperial power. This independence was further confirmed by an edict of Emperor Zeno.

In 478, Archbishop Anthemius of Cyprus claimed to have discovered the grave of Barnabas and his relics following a vision. On Barnabas's chest was found a copy of the Gospel of Matthew. This discovery allowed the church to petition the emperor independently, demonstrating the connection to its reputed founder. Emperor Zeno reaffirmed the Church of Cyprus's status and granted its archbishop the "three privileges": the right to sign documents with ink made vermilion by the addition of cinnabar; to wear tyrian purple robes under his vestments; and to hold an imperial sceptre instead of the standard episcopal crosier.

Cyprus suffered significant destruction during Arab invasions in subsequent centuries. During the reign of Justinian II, the cities of Constantia, Kourion, and Paphos were sacked. On the Emperor's advice, the archbishop and survivors fled to the Dardanelles and established the city of Nova Justiniana (Greek: Νέα Ιουστινιανή, Néa Iustinianē) at Erdek near Cyzicus. In 692, the Quinisext Council reconfirmed the privileges of the exiled archbishop, and in 698, following the Arab withdrawal from Cyprus, the archbishop returned while retaining the title "archbishop of Nova Justiniana and All Cyprus", a practice that continues to this day.

=== Crusader era ===
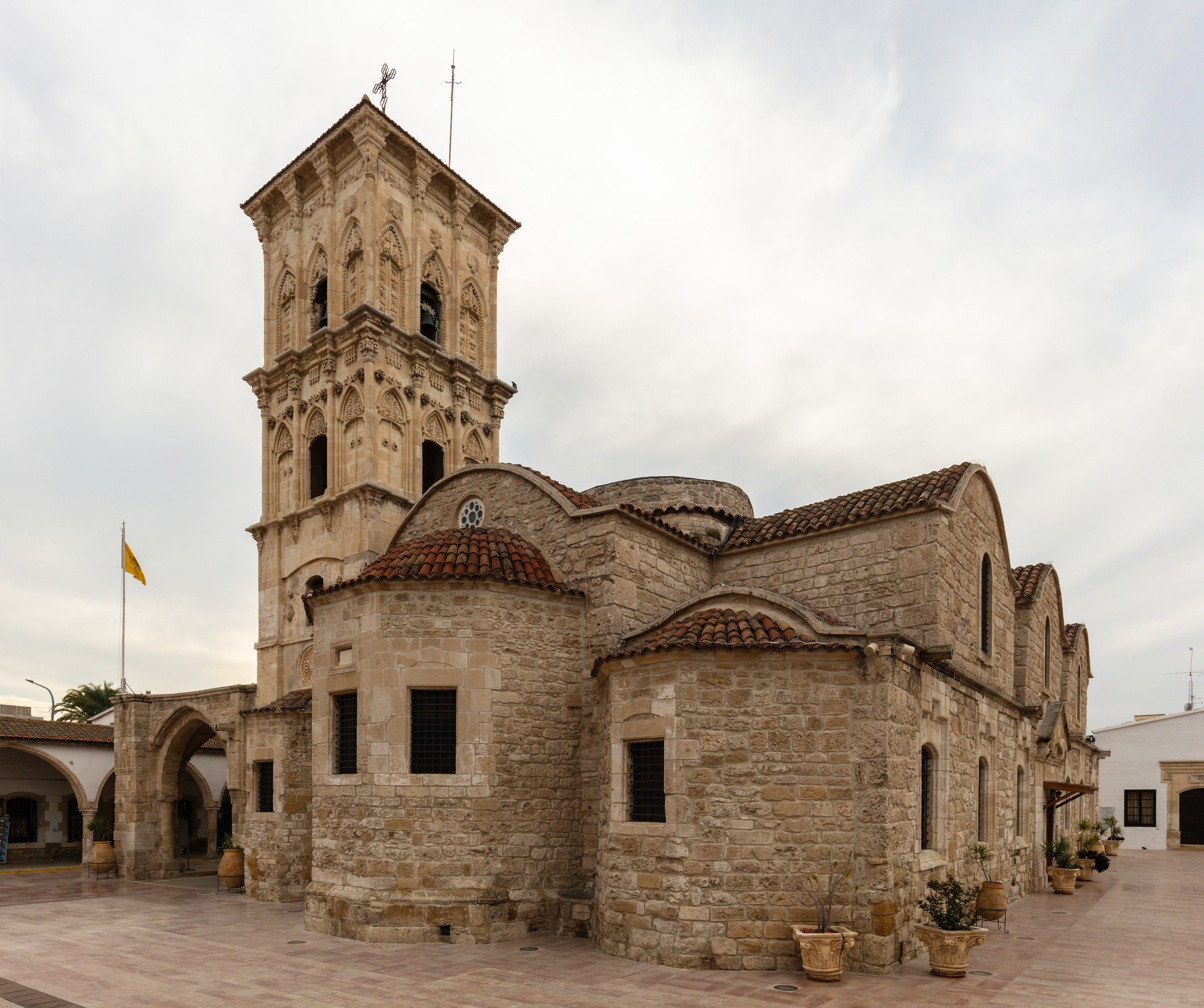
Church of Saint Lazarus, Larnaca

After the establishment of the Kingdom of Cyprus in 1191, the Catholic rulers gradually reduced the number of Orthodox bishoprics from fourteen to four and relocated Orthodox prelates away from their traditional seats. The Orthodox Archbishop of Cyprus was moved from Nicosia to Solia near Morphou, and the Bishop of Larnaca was transferred to the village of Lefkara. Orthodox bishops were placed under the jurisdiction of the corresponding Catholic bishops in the region, reflecting the dominance of the Latin hierarchy over the native church during the Frankish period.

On several occasions, Catholic authorities sought to compel Orthodox bishops to conform to Latin doctrinal and liturgical practices, at times using threats or violence. A notable example of this tension was the persecution of thirteen Orthodox monks from Kantara Monastery who resisted Latin liturgical reforms; they were tried for heresy, imprisoned, and ultimately executed in 1231. Properties belonging to numerous Orthodox monasteries were seized by Catholic institutions, yet these measures failed to eradicate the Orthodox faith among the Greek Cypriot population.

Despite early conflicts, the Orthodox and Catholic communities eventually established a relatively stable coexistence. Local Orthodox Christians benefited from the broader economic growth of Cyprus, particularly in the prosperous port city of Famagusta. The Orthodox cathedral of St George—known as Saint George of the Greeks and now in ruins—was nearly as tall as the nearby Catholic cathedral of St Nicholas, illustrating the continuing presence and significance of the Orthodox Church.

In 1489 the Frankish Lusignan dynasty was succeeded by the Venetians, whose governance brought no substantial change to the institutional status of the Eastern Orthodox Church in Cyprus.

=== Cypriot independence ===
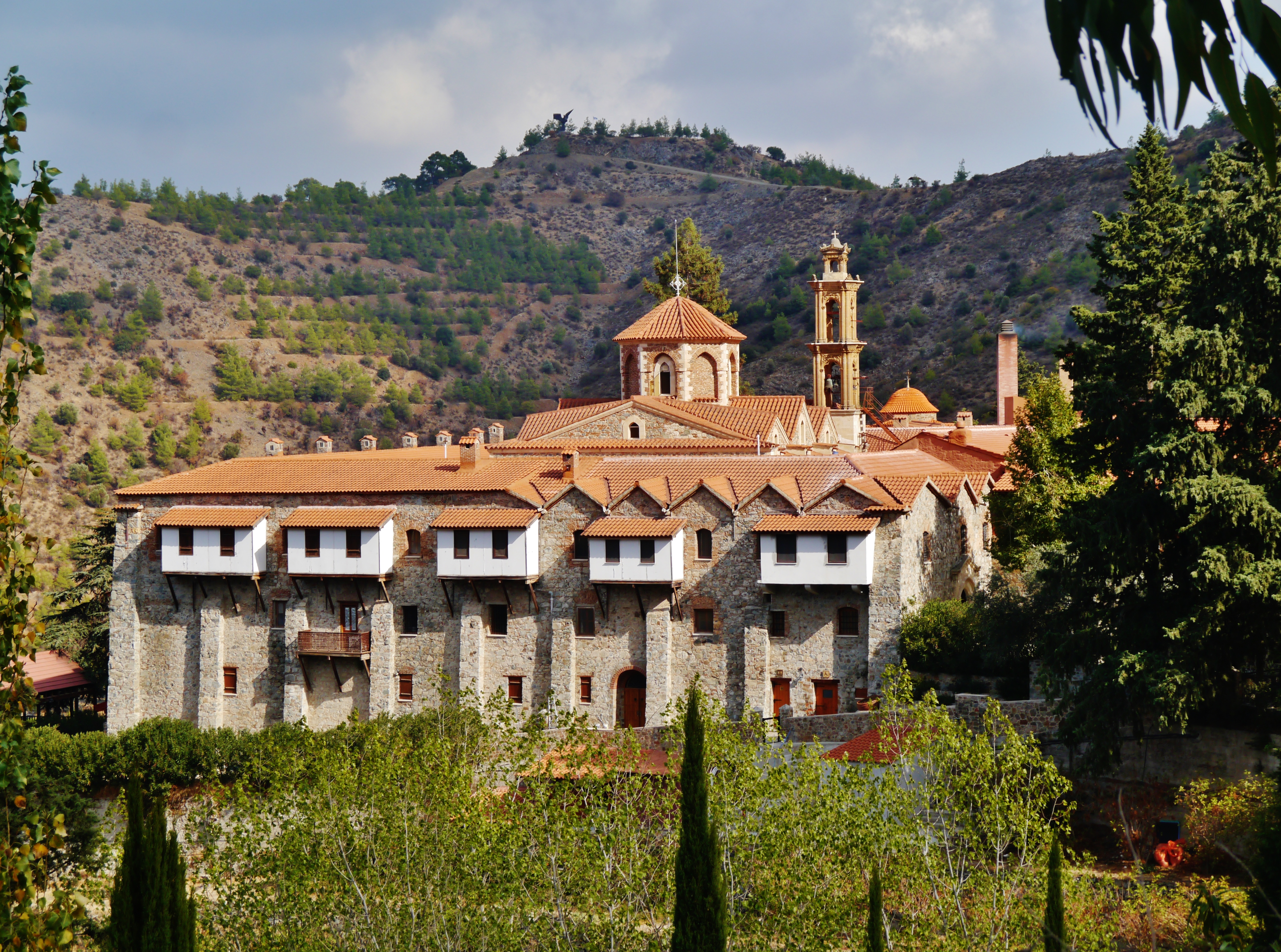
Machairas Monastery

In 1950, Makarios III was elected Archbishop. While still Bishop of Kition he had demonstrated strong intellectual and national activity. In 1949 he founded the Apostle Varnavas Seminary, and in 1950 he organised the referendum on the union (Enosis) between Cyprus and Greece. While archbishop he was the political leader of EOKA from 1955 to 1959. The British exiled him to Seychelles because of his activities.

In 1960, Makarios III was elected president of the newly established Republic of Cyprus. Disagreements with the other three bishops led to the 1972–1973 Cypriot ecclesiastical coup attempt. Following the dethronement of the bishops of Paphos, Kitium and Kyrenia for conspiring against Makarios, two new Bishoprics were created: the Bishopric of Limassol which was detached from the Bishopric of Kition, and the Bishopric of Morfou which was detached from the Bishopric of Kyrenia. The coup d'état of 15 July 1974 forced Archbishop Makarios III to leave the island. He returned in December 1974.

=== Turkish invasion ===
The coup d'état was followed by the Turkish invasion of 20 July 1974 which significantly affected the church and its members; as 35% of Cyprus's territory came under Turkish occupation, hundreds of thousands of Orthodox Christians were displaced and those that could not or did not want to leave (20,000 initially) faced oppression. As of May 2001 figures only 421 Greek Orthodox Cypriots and 155 Maronites remain in Northern Cyprus.

The destruction of Christian monuments was another consequence of the invasion. Churches containing Byzantine icons, frescoes and mosaics have been pillaged by antiquities dealers and sold on the black market. One of the most prominent cases of pillage was of the mosaics of Panagia of Kanakaria of the 6th century, which were returned to the Church of Cyprus, following rulings by federal courts in Indianapolis and Chicago. In Northern Cyprus, there are 514 churches, chapels and monasteries, many of which were converted to mosques, museums or abandoned.

=== Recent events ===
Flag of the Church of Cyprus

On 3 August 1977, Makarios III died and was succeeded by Archbishop Chrysostomos I. In 1979, the new Statutory Charter of the Church of Cyprus was drawn up and approved replacing the old one from 1914.

In his old age, Archbishop Chrysostomos I suffered from Alzheimer's disease and was unable to carry out his duties for a number of years. In May 2006, Ecumenical Patriarch Bartholomew I chaired a broader meeting of church elders which called for Chrysostomos I's "honorary removal".

Chrysostomos II was elected the new archbishop on 5 November 2006, after a long-running election campaign.

After the death of Chrysostomos II, the 2022 Cypriot archiepiscopal election was called to choose his successor, with George III elected.

== Administration and Holy Synod ==
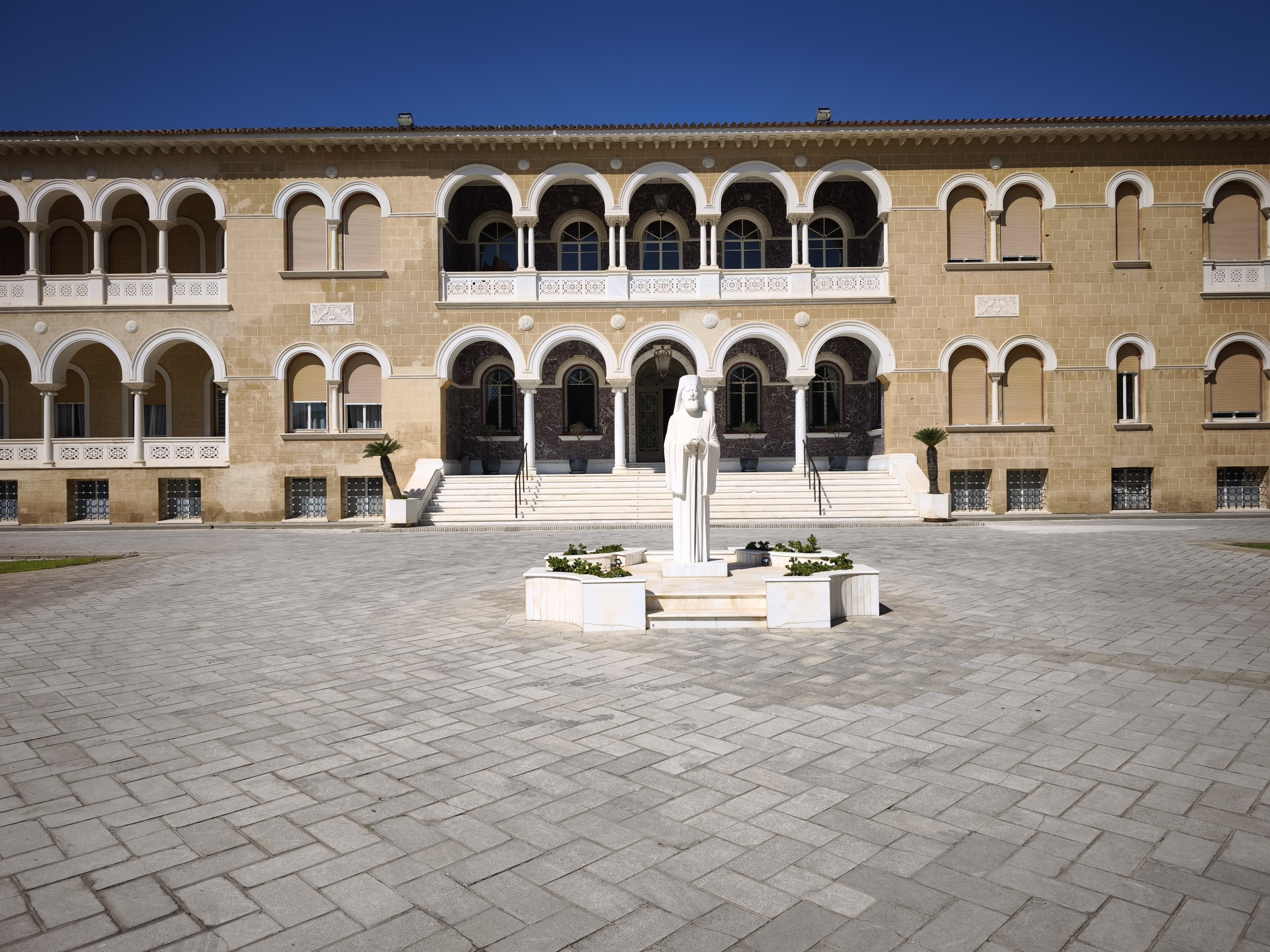
Archbishop's Palace, Nicosia

The Holy Synod of the Church of Cyprus is the highest church authority in Cyprus. Its task is to examine and provide solutions on all issues concerning the Church of Cyprus. The head of the Holy Synod and of the Church of Cyprus is Archbishop George III. The Holy Synod regularly convenes on the first week after Easter and in the first fortnight of every February and September. It holds sessions whenever deemed necessary, or when two of its members put forward a request.

=== Metropolises and metropolitans ===
- Metropolis of Paphos and Exarchate of Arsinoe and Romaeon: Grigorios Ioannidis (2026–present)
- Metropolis of Kition and Exarchate of Larnaca and Pano Lefkara: Nectarios Spirou (2019–present)
- Metropolis of Kyrenia and Exarchate of Lapithos and Karavas: Chrysostomos Kykkotis (2011–present)
- Metropolis of Limassol, Amathus and Kourion: Athanasios Nikolaou (1999–present)
- Metropolis of Morphou and Soloi: Neophytos (Omiros) Masouras (1998–present)
- Metropolis of Constantia and Ammochostos: Vasileios Karayiannis (2007–present)
- Metropolis of Kykkos and Tillyria: Nikiphoros Kykkotis (2007–present)
- Metropolis of Tamassos and Oreini: Isaias Kykkotis (2007–present)
- Metropolis of Trimithous: Varnavas Stavrovouniotis (2007–present)

=== Dioceses and bishops ===
- Diocese of Karpasia: Christophoros Tsiakas (2007–present)
- Diocese of Arsinoe: Nektarios Spyrou (2008–present)
- Diocese of Amathus: Nikolaos Xiouri (2007–present)

=== Titular dioceses and bishops ===
- Diocese of Ledra: Epiphanios Mahairiotis (2007–present)
- Diocese of Kytros: Leontios Englistriotis (2007–present)
- Diocese of Neapolis: Porphyrios Mahairiotis (2007–present)
- Diocese of Mesaoria: Grigorios Hatziouraniou (2008–present)

== See also ==
- Religion in Cyprus
- Christianity in Cyprus
- Omega TV Cyprus

== Sources ==
- Coureas, Nicholas (2019). "The Syrian Melkites of the Lusignan Kingdom of Cyprus (1192–1474)". Chronos: Revue d'Histoire de l'Université de Balamand. 40: 75–94. Archived from the original on 2021-01-28.
- Kiminas, Demetrius (2009). The Ecumenical Patriarchate: A History of Its Metropolitanates with Annotated Hierarch Catalogs. Wildside Press LLC. ISBN 9781434458766.
- Meyendorff, John (1989). Imperial Unity and Christian Divisions: The Church 450–680 A.D. Crestwood, NY: St. Vladimir's Seminary Press. ISBN 9780881410563. Archived from the original on 2024-12-12.
- Ostrogorsky, George (1956). History of the Byzantine State. Oxford: Basil Blackwell. Archived from the original on 2024-09-30.
- Roudometof, Victor (2010). "The Transformation of Greek Orthodox Ecclesiastical Institutions in Cyprus, 1878–1931". Chronos: Revue d'Histoire de l'Université de Balamand. 22: 7–23. Archived from the original on 2022-01-23.
