= Neophytos Masouras =

Greek Cypriot clergyman

Metropolitan Neophytos of Morphou
- Μόρφου Νεόφυτος
- Born: Omiros Masouras; 21 January 1962 (age 64); Pano Zodeia, Nicosia District, Cyprus
- Education: National and Kapodistrian University of Athens
- Religion: Eastern Orthodoxy
- Church: Church of Cyprus

Neophytos of Morphou (born 21 January 1962 as Omiros Masouras, Greek: Όμηρος Μασούρας) is a Greek Cypriot clergyman of the Eastern Orthodox Church and bishop of the autocephalous Church of Cyprus. He was elected Metropolitan of Morphou on 13 September 1998.

== Biography ==
Omiros Masouras was born in 1962 in Pano Zodeia, near Morfou, Nicosia District. There he lived the first 12 years of his life. His childhood was marked by the death of his father at the age of 8, while at the age of 12 he experienced the Turkish invasion of Cyprus and the death of his older brother, Petros. As a refugee, he spent his teenage years in the refugee settlement of Latsia, outside Nicosia. In 1979 he started studying at the National and Kapodistrian University of Athens.

On 27 December 1987, he was ordained deacon by Metropolitan Chrysostomos of Kition and on 19 December 1993, elder. He served as a deacon and chaplain in the Diocese of Kition. On 13 September 1998, he was ordained Metropolitan of Morphou.

== Personal beliefs ==
Neophytos has promoted conspiracy theories about the COVID-19 and the New World Order. Neophytos was openly against COVID-19 vaccines and one of the measures about the pandemic in Greece and Cyprus to change time of the Eastertide procession from 12 AM to 9 PM. He said that Eastern Orthodox people should try to avoid electronic identification and that he himself has not received such an ID and will try to delay it as much as he can.

Neophytos is against ecumenism. He has said that the Russian invasion of Ukraine happened because God wants to purge the world from Masons and that Russian president Vladimir Putin wants to stop the New World Order. As such, he did not attend Pope Francis' visit to the Archdiocese of Cyprus.

In various ministries and Eastern Orthodox liturgies, Neophytos persuaded people to not wear masks or follow measures against COVID as he supported that they are "satanic" and are not beneficial. Despite the government's orders to not attend such events at the pandemic, Neophytos violated the orders and normally proceeded with the Palm Sunday event at his church where he was eventually arrested after a police check to see if he was complying with measures.

Neophytus has said that homosexuality is caused by a mother enjoying "unnatural sex," including anal sex, and then passing on those desires to their unborn fetus.
