= St. John's Cathedral, Nicosia =

Main church of the Church of Cyprus

Coordinates: 35.172°N 33.367°E

Cathedral of St. John the Evangelist
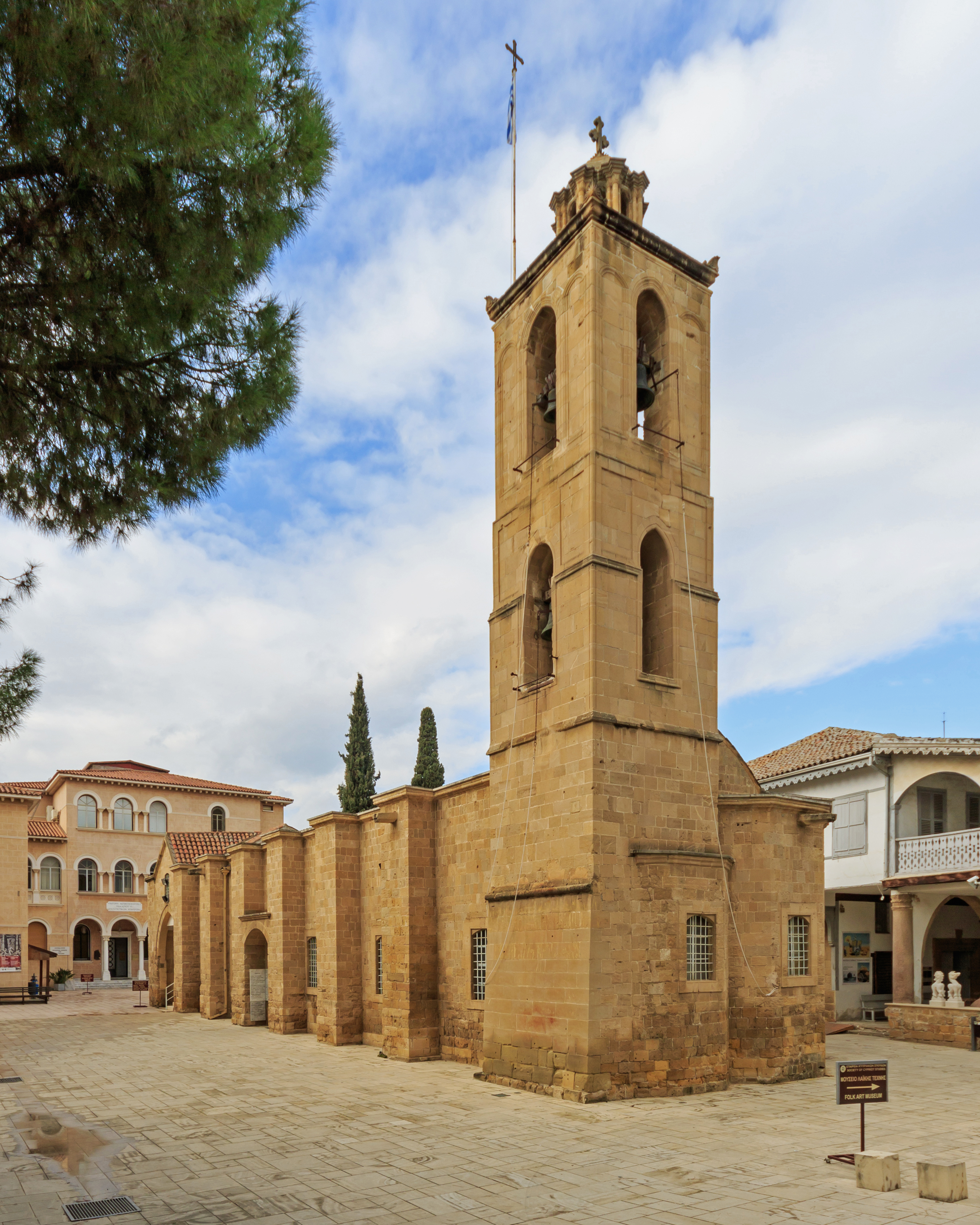

Religion
- Affiliation: Church of Cyprus

Location
- Location: Nicosia, Cyprus
- Interactive map of Cathedral of St. John the Evangelist

The Cathedral of St. John the Evangelist (Greek: Καθεδρικός Ναός Αγίου Ιωάννη) is the main church of the Church of Cyprus. It is located in Nicosia, the capital city of Cyprus.

The church was built in the fourteenth century at the site of the Catholic Benedictine Abbey of St. John the Evangelist that had been founded by the House of Lusignan. The first reference to the church appears in historical sources starting from the eleventh century. Due to frequent Mamluk invasions, Benedictines left the island in 1426, and the monastery was passed over to the Orthodox. However, the monastery retained its dedication to John the Evangelist.

Archbishop Nikiphoros reconstructed the church in the seventeenth century. He used part of the remaining basement for the reconstruction. A marble slab was installed above the western entrance to the church. The slab has a date, 30 April 1662, indicating when reconstruction of the church was started. Although the precise date of the end of reconstruction is unclear but it is assumed that reconstruction was finished between 1662 and 1674. The church became the residence of the Archbishop of Cyprus in 1720. The enthronements of Archbishops of Cyprus are held there.
