= Freedom of religion in Northern Cyprus =

The constitution of Northern Cyprus protects the freedom of religion, and it states that Northern Cyprus is a secular state.

The US Department of State report in 2002 stated that religious freedom was protected by law in Northern Cyprus and the government generally respected the freedom of religion. The freedom of religion report in 2007 by US Department of State also stated that "Turkish Cypriot authorities generally respected this right in practice" and the practice of religion was generally free. In 2009, Minority Rights Group International also reported that Turkish Cypriot authorities respected religious freedom in general.

== Christianity ==
Members of the Turkish-Speaking Protestant Association and the Greek Orthodox Church report police surveillance of their activities, with plainclothes police officers present during worship services, checking priests’ identification and monitoring the congregation; it is also reported that Turkish Cypriots who converted from Islam to other faiths often experience societal pressure and discrimination.

=== Anglican churches ===
There are two Anglican churches in Northern Cyprus. They are:

- St Andrew's Church in Kyrenia
- St Mark's Church in Famagusta

=== Orthodox Christianity ===
Greek Cypriot Orthodox and Maronite Catholics are allowed to perform religious services without prior permission at certain church buildings; services outside those buildings must have official permission from the government.

On 28 September 2010, Resolution 1631, was approved by the U.S. House of Representatives:

"... calling for the protection of religious sites and artifacts from and in Turkish-occupied areas of northern Cyprus as well as for general respect for religious freedom."

The Turkish Foreign Ministry responded with a press released statement, saying that the resolution had "many factual errors which may harm the credibility of the House of Representatives".

On 27 January 2011, the Parliamentary Assembly of the Council of Europe, in written declaration no. 467, condemned the alleged interruption of the Christmas mass in Northern Cyprus by Turkish troops and restrictions to the right to freedom of religion and worship. The declaration claimed that Turkish troops forced the priest conducting the service to remove his vestments and ordered everybody to leave the church, thus violating the European Convention on Human Rights.

On 18 March 2011, 204 Greek school books, including religious books, that were being taken to the schools at Rizokarpaso were confiscated by Turkish Cypriot customs officers at the Pergamos village barricade. The Turkish Cypriot daily newspaper Afrika, in a front page article, criticised those who claim that there is freedom of religion in Northern Cyprus when the religious books were confiscated.

=== Church service restriction controversy ===
On 20 May 2016, Northern Cypriot Foreign Minister Tahsin Ertuğruloğlu restricted Greek Orthodox communities to only hold a single religious service per year, with the exceptions of the Apostolos Andreas Monastery in Rizokarpaso, the Monastery of St. Barnabas in Famagusta and St. Mamas' Church in Morphou. The remaining churches could be used for one of the following three feasts: the church's Name Day, Easter or Christmas. Undersecretary Mustafa Lakadamyalı claimed that the move was to prevent the "abuse" of the permission to hold masses, also citing difficulties with the policing of more than one mass a day or frequent masses. Lakadamyalı also said that "whilst some TRNC citizens can pass to the south even for worship, some absolutely cannot". No restriction was placed on Maronites.

The decision was harshly criticized by Turkish Cypriot group Famagusta Initiative as "chauvinist and intolerant" and it was pointed out that no problem was encountered in the masses which took place in, for example, the Nestorian Church in Famagusta. Ertuğruloğlu's decision was also criticized by Burak Mavis of the Turkish Cypriot Teachers’ Trade Union (KTOS) who called out the whole debate as being driven by "a backwards and racist political mentality," but it was defended by Yilmaz Bora, the leader of the Association of the Ex-Servicemen of the Turkish Resistance Organisation, who was cited as saying "it was not possible to live with the Greek Cypriots in a United Cyprus, because the mentality of the Greek Cypriots has not changed in 53 years."

== Judaism ==
There is a synagogue for the Jewish community in Northern Cyprus in Kyrenia.

== Education ==
Religious instruction is mandatory for pupils in grades 4-8 in all schools; non-Muslim pupils may opt out after two years. Religious instruction is optional at high school. Classes focus primarily on Sunni Islam but also include other religions.

== See also ==
- Turkish Cypriot Protestants
