= Church of Saint Lazarus, Larnaca =

Coordinates: 34.911495°N 33.634793°E

Church of Saint Lazarus Ιερός Ναός Αγίου Λαζάρου
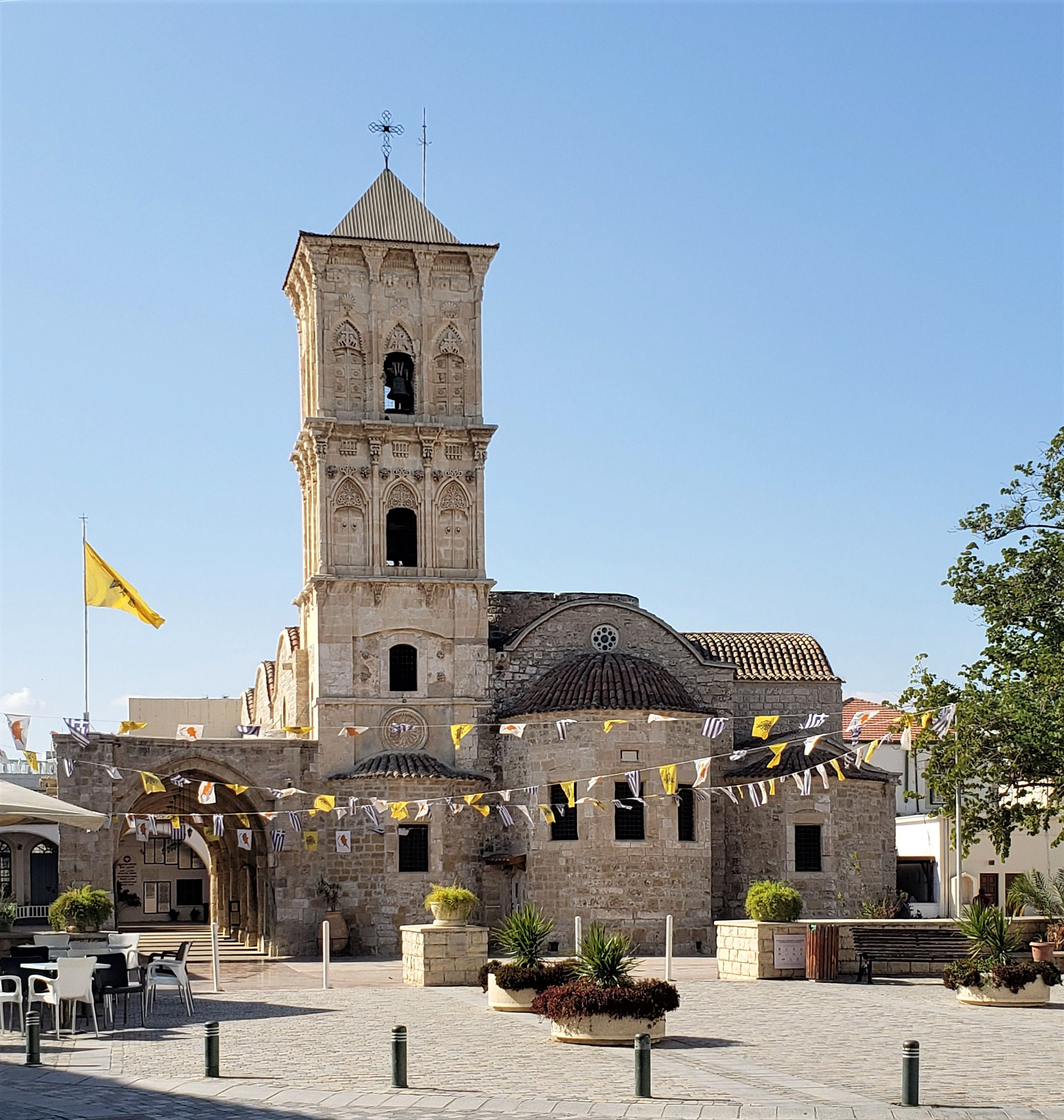
- Saint Lazarus Church in Larnaca
- Church of Saint Lazarus; Ιερός Ναός Αγίου Λαζάρου
- Location: Larnaca
- Country: Cyprus
- Denomination: Church of Cyprus
- Website: www.agioslazaros.org (in Greek)

History
- Founded: Late 9th century
- Dedication: Lazarus of Bethany

Architecture
- Style: Byzantine, Gothic, Baroque, Rococo

The Church of Saint Lazarus (Greek: Ιερός Ναός Αγίου Λαζάρου, Ierós Naós Agíou Lazárou) is a late-9th century church in Larnaca, Cyprus. It belongs to the Church of Cyprus, an autocephalous Greek Orthodox Church.

The Church of Saint Lazarus is named for New Testament figure Lazarus of Bethany, the subject of a miracle recounted in the Gospel of John, in which Jesus raises him from the dead. According to Eastern Orthodox tradition, sometime after the Resurrection of Jesus, Lazarus was forced to flee Judea because of rumoured plots on his life and came to Cyprus. There he was appointed by Paul the Apostle and Barnabas as the first Bishop of Kition (now Larnaca). He is said to have lived for thirty more years and on his death was buried there for the second and last time. The Church of Agios Lazaros was built over the reputed second tomb of Lazarus.

== History and architecture ==
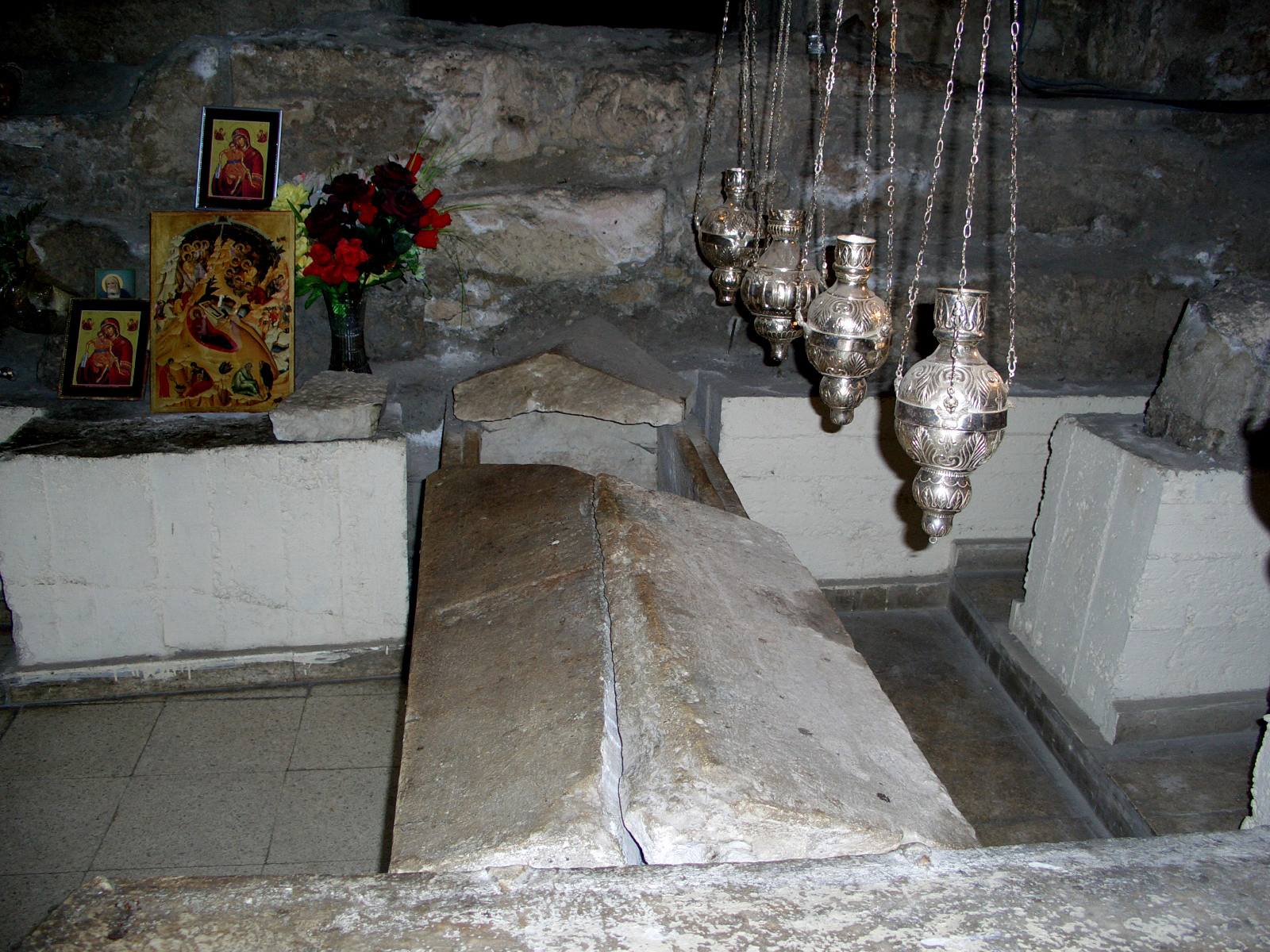
Tomb of Saint Lazarus in the Church of St. Lazarus

Tradition says that the place of Lazarus's tomb was lost during the period of Arab rule beginning in 649. In 890, a tomb was found in Larnaca bearing the inscription "Lazarus, four days dead, friend of Christ". Emperor Leo VI of the Byzantine Empire had Lazarus's remains transferred to Constantinople in 898. The transferred relics were later looted by the Fourth Crusade in the early 13th century and were brought to Marseille and subsequently lost.

In recompense to Larnaca for the translation, Emperor Leo had the Church of St. Lazarus erected over Lazarus' tomb in the late 9th to early 10th centuries.

The church is an elongated building measuring 31.5 m × 14.5 m (103 ft × 48 ft) with a tripartite sanctuary, semicircular apses internally and three-sided externally, and a five-sided apse in the center. The interior structure of the church is divided into three aisles with bulky double pillars and arched openings going through them. These pillars bear the weight of the domes thus forming the central aisle while the north and south aisles bear a semi-cylindrical roof, intersected by cross-vaults. The stonework of the church consists mainly of square limestone blocks about 1 m (3.3 ft) in thickness. The church has an open porch, from which steps descend into the church.

Under Frankish and Venetian rule (the 13th to 16th centuries), the church became Roman Catholic. A stone-covered portico (stoa) of Gothic style was added on its south side during this time.

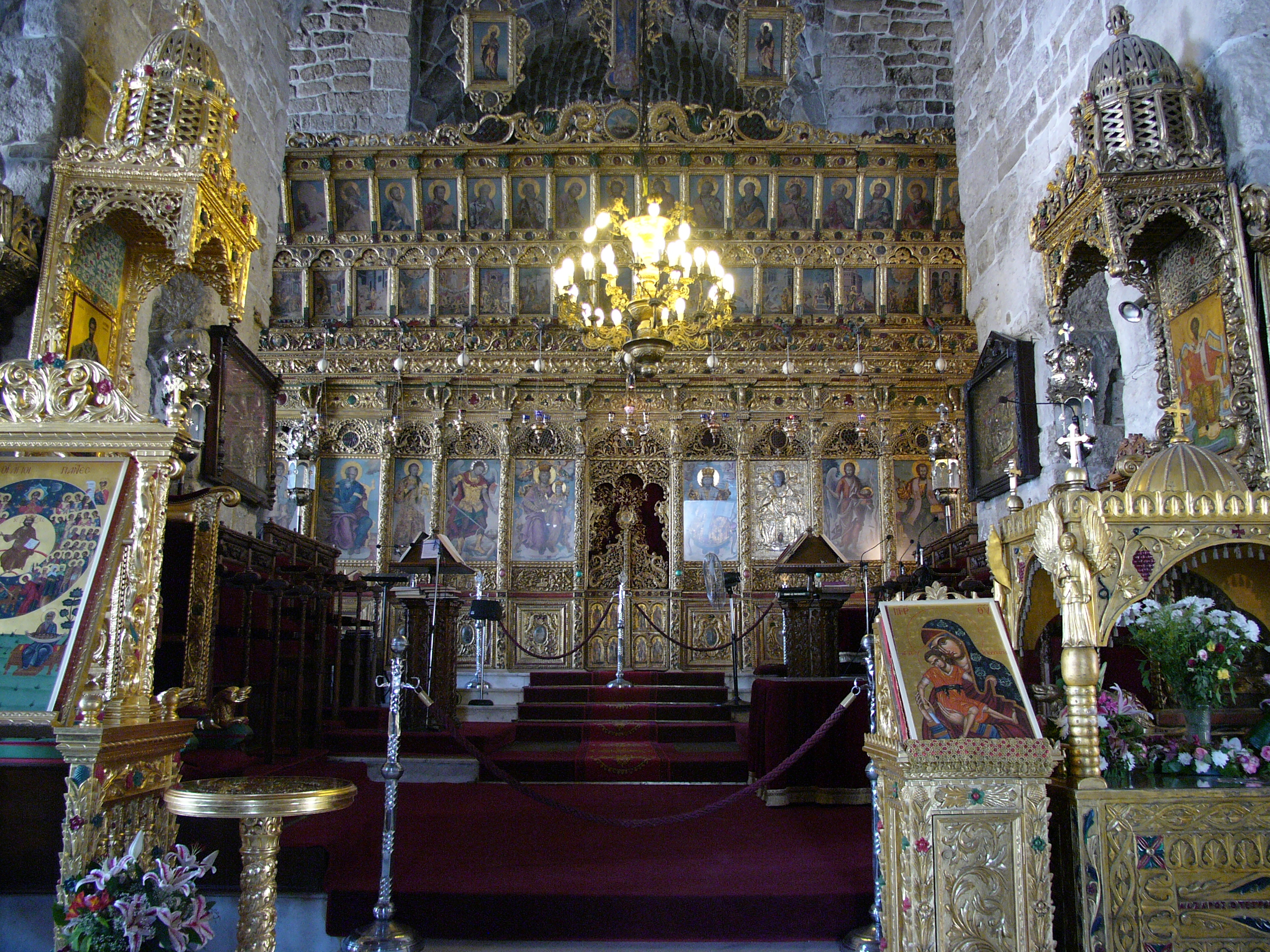
Iconostasis of the Church of St. Lazarus

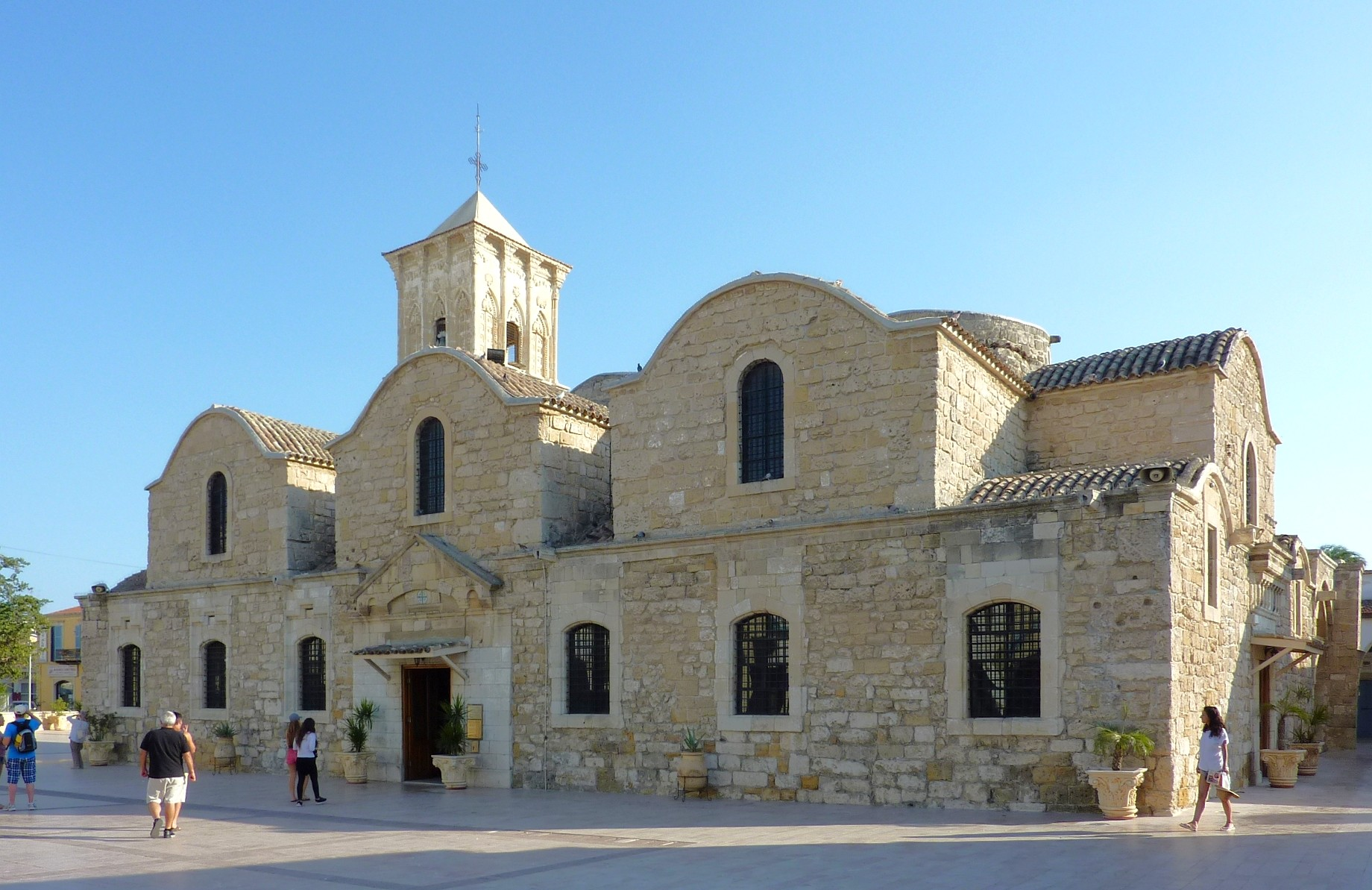
View of the church from the northwest

The three imposing domes of this Orthodox Basilica Church and the original bell tower were destroyed, probably in the first years of Ottoman rule (1571), when the church was turned into a mosque. In 1589, the Ottomans sold it back to the Orthodox, probably because of its Christian cemetery. For the next two hundred years it was used for both Orthodox and Catholic services. The porch bears traces of Greek, Latin, and French inscriptions. In 1857, after the Ottoman authorities again allowed Cypriot churches to have bell towers, the church's bell tower was rebuilt in a Latinate style.

The woodcarving of the unique Baroque iconostasis of the church was done between 1773 and 1782 by Chatzisavvas Taliadorou. The iconostasis was gold-plated between 1793 and 1797. Some of the icons were painted towards the end of the 18th century by Michael Proskynetes from Marathasa. Icon painter Hatzimichael completed the iconography of the iconostasis in 1797. Some of the wood-carved furniture (including a Rococo pulpit on one pillar for Catholic use) and icons on the walls are from the 17th century.

A fire in 1970 damaged much of the interior, including extensive damage to a section of the iconostasis together with the corresponding icons. The iconostasis has been partially restored and was re-plated with gold between 1972 and 1974. During the subsequent renovations of the church, on November 2, 1972, human remains were discovered in a marble sarcophagus under the altar, and were identified as part of the saint's relics (apparently, not all were moved to Constantinople).

== Traditions ==
On Lazarus Saturday, eight days before Easter, the icon of Saint Lazarus is taken in procession through the streets of Larnaca.

== See also ==
- Church of Cyprus
- Lazarus of Bethany
- Religion in Cyprus
- Tomb of Lazarus – The first tomb of Lazarus, in Bethany, Palestine
