= Arsinoe (Southwest Cyprus) =

Ancient city in Cyprus

Coordinates: 34°44′23″N 32°27′00″E

Arsinoe (Ancient Greek: Ἀρσινόη) was a city in southwestern ancient Cyprus, lying between Palaepaphos in modern Kouklia and Nea Paphos in modern Paphos, with a harbour, temple, and sacred grove described by Strabo. The city was founded by Ptolemy II Philadelphus and named for Arsinoe II of Egypt, his wife and sister. Due to its subjection to the kings of the Ptolemaic dynasty, Cyprus had more than one city of this name –including one in the northwest– which was common to several princesses of that house.

The site of Arsinoe is tentatively located near modern Geroskipou-Litharka/Vounimenos.
