= History of Armenians in Cyprus =

Armenians have a long history in Cyprus, with the first confirmed presence of Armenians on the island dating back to 578 AD, during the reign of Byzantine Emperor Justin II. In the modern Republic of Cyprus, they are recognized as one of the three minority "religious groups" along with the Maronites and Latins.

== Byzantine Era (578–1191) ==
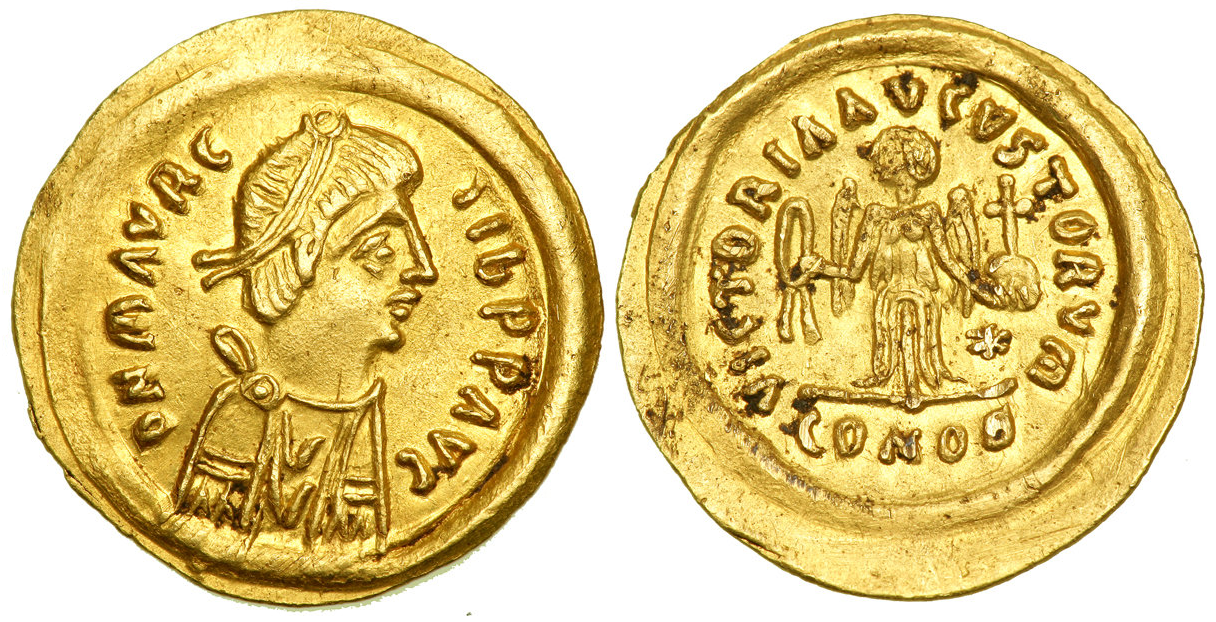
Solidus of Emperor Maurice

There is a long link between the Armenians and Cyprus, possibly dating back to the 5th century BC. However, Armenians have had a continuous documented presence in Cyprus since 578 AD: according to historian Theophylact Simocatta, during his campaign against the Persian King Chosroes I, Byzantine General (and future Emperor) Maurice the Cappadocian captured 10,090 Armenians as prisoners in Arzanene (Aghdznik), of whom about 3,350 were deported to Cyprus. Judging by the strategic position of the colonies they established (Armenokhori, Arminou, Kornokipos, Patriki, Platani, Spathariko and perhaps Mousere), it is very likely that these Armenians served Byzantium as mercenary soldiers and frontiersmen.

More Armenians arrived during the reign of Armenian-descended Emperor Heraclius (610–641) for political reasons (he attempted to bridge the differences between the Armenian Church and the Eastern Orthodox Church), during the pontificate of Catholicos Hovhannes III Odznetsi (717–728) for commercial reasons and after the liberation of Cyprus from the Arab raids by patrician Niketas Chalkoutzes (965) for military reasons, when Armenian mercenaries were transferred to Cyprus to protect it. In the middle Byzantine period, Armenian generals and governors served in Cyprus, like Alexios Mousele or Mousere (868–874), Basil Haigaz (958), Vahram (965), Elpidios Brachamios (1075–1085) and Leo Symbatikes (910–911), who undertook the construction of Saint Lazarus' basilica in Larnaca. It appears that Saint Lazarus' church had been an Armenian Apostolic church in the 10th century and was used by Armenian-Catholics during the Latin Era as well.

The numerous Armenians required an analogous spiritual pastorate, and so in 973 Catholicos Khatchig I established the Armenian Bishopric in Nicosia. Relations between Cyprus and the Armenians became closer when the Kingdom of Cilicia was established. The Kingdom, on the coast of Cilicia to the north of the island, was established at around 1080 AD by Armenian refugees who fled the Seljuk invasion to the north and remained an ally of Byzantium. Between 1136 and 1138, Byzantine Emperor John II Comnenus moved the entire population of the Armenian city of Tell Hamdun to Cyprus. After Isaac Comnenus' wedding to the daughter of the Armenian prince Thoros II in 1185, Armenian nobles and warriors came with him to Cyprus, many of whom defended the island against Richard the Lionheart (May 1191), when he landed in Limassol in a conquering mood, and the Knights Templar (April 1192), who had purchased Cyprus from Richard and governed with a particular cruelty. Eventually, the Templars returned the island to Richard, who in turn sold it to Guy de Lusignan.

== Latin Era (1191–1570) ==
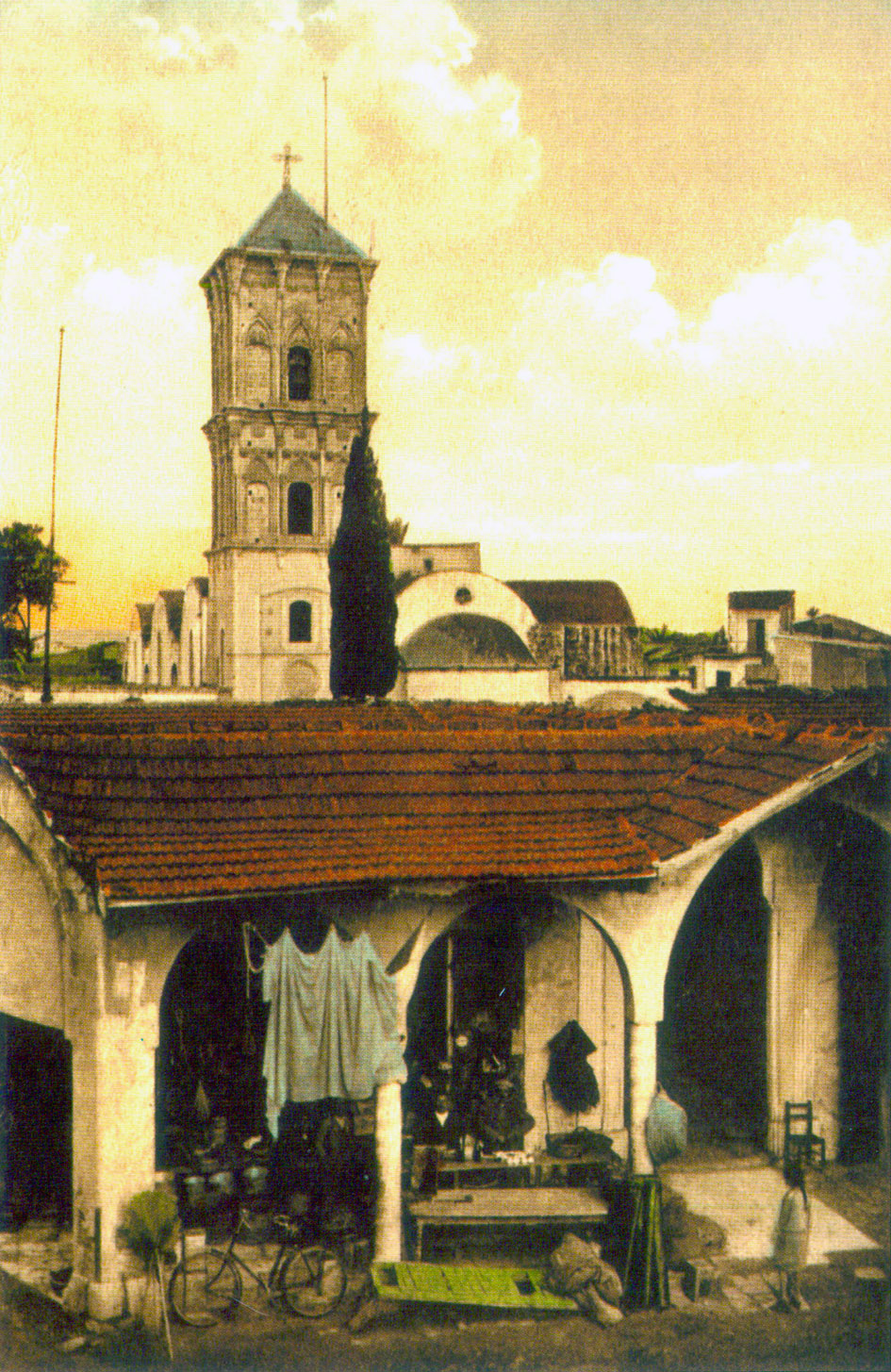
Saint Lazarus' basilica in Larnaca

After the purchase of Cyprus by titular Frankish King of Jerusalem Guy de Lusignan in 1192, in his attempt to establish a western-type feudal kingdom, the latter sent emissaries to Europe, Cilicia and the Levant, resulting in a massive immigration of Armenians and other peoples from Western Europe, Cilicia and the Levant (mainly Franks, Latins and Maronites, as well as Copts, Ethiopians, Georgians, Jacobites, Jews, Melkites, Nestorians and others). To these numerous bourgeois, noblemen, knights and warriors, fiefs, manors, lands, offices and various privileges were bounteously granted. Because of their proximity, their commercial ties and a series of royal and nobility marriages, the Kingdom of Cyprus and the Kingdom of Cilicia became inextricably linked. In the subsequent centuries, thousands of Cilician Armenians sought refuge in Cyprus fleeing the Muslim attacks: the Fall of Antioch (1268), the Fall of Acre (1291), the attack of the Saracens (1322), the Mameluke attacks (1335 and 1346) and the Ottoman occupation of Cilicia (1403 and 1421). Cyprus became now the easternmost bulwark of Christianity; in 1441 the authorities of Famagusta invited Armenians from Cilicia to settle there.

The Fall of Sis in April 1375 put an end to the Armenian Kingdom of Cilicia; its last King, Levon V, was granted safe passage to Cyprus and died in exile in Paris in 1393, after calling in vain for another Crusade. In 1396, his title and privileges were transferred to his cousin, King James I de Lusignan, in the Saint Sophia cathedral; subsequently, the royal crest of the Lusignan dynasty also bore the lion of Armenia. Thus ended the last fully independent Armenian entity of the Middle Ages, after nearly three centuries of sovereignty and bloom; the title of "King of Armenia" was then held through the centuries down to the modern day by the House of Savoy, through the marriage of Queen Charlotte of Cyprus to Louis of Savoy. Although the Egyptian Mamelukes had taken over Cilicia, they were unable to maintain their hold on it; Turkic tribes eventually made their way to the region and established themselves there, leading to the conquest of Cilicia by Tamerlane. As a result, 30,000 Armenians left Cilicia in 1403 and settled in Cyprus, which continued to be ruled by the Lusignan dynasty until 1489.

During the Frankish and the Venetian Eras (1192–1489 and 1489–1570, respectively) there were Armenian churches in Nicosia, Famagusta, Spathariko [Sourp Sarkis (Saint Sergius) and Sourp Varvare (Saint Barbara)], Kornokipos [Sourp Hreshdagabedk (Saint Archangels)], Platani [Sourp Kevork (Saint George)], Piscopia and elsewhere [Sourp Parsegh (Saint Basil)]. Armenians were amongst the seven most important religious groups in Cyprus, in possession of stores and shops in the ports of Famagusta, Limassol and Paphos, as well as in the capital Nicosia, thus controlling a large segment of commerce. Additionally, Armenian was one of the eleven official languages of the Kingdom of Cyprus and one of the five official languages of the Venetian colonial administration of Cyprus.

According to chroniclers Leontios Makhairas (1369–1458), George Boustronios (1430–1501) and Florio Bustron (1500–1570), the Armenians of Nicosia had their own Prelature and used to live in their own quarter, called Armenia or Armenoyitonia. They originally had three churches: Sourp Kevork (Saint George), Sourp Boghos-Bedros (Saints Paul and Peter) and Sourp Khach (Holy Cross) – believed to the today's Arablar mosque or Stavros tou Missirikou. In Famagusta, a Bishopric was established in the late 12th century and Armenians lived around the Syrian quarter. Historical documents suggest the presence of an important monastic and theological centre there, at which Saint Nerses Lampronatsi (1153–1198) is said to have studied; of the three Armenian churches of walled Famagusta [Sourp Asdvadzadzin (Mother of God), Sourp Sarkis (Saint Sergius) and Sourp Khach (Holy Cross) – believed to be the unidentified church between the Carmelite church and Saint Anne], only Ganchvor Church survives, built in 1346.

During the Middle Ages, Armenians in Cyprus were actively engaged in commerce, while some of them formed military garrisons in Kyrenia (1322) and elsewhere. A number of Armenians defended the Frankish Kingdom of Cyprus against the Genoese (1373) at Xeros, against the Saracens (1425) at Stylli village and against the Mamelukes (1426) in Limassol and Khirokitia. By 1425, the renowned Magaravank – originally the Coptic monastery of Saint Makarios near Halevga (Pentadhaktylos region) – came under Armenian possession, as did sometime before 1504 the Benedictine/Carthusian nunnery of Notre Dame de Tyre or Tortosa (Sourp Asdvadzadzin) in walled Nicosia; many of its nuns had been of Armenian origin (such as princess Fimie, daughter of the Armenian King Hayton II). During the Latin Era, there was also a small number of Armenian Catholics in Nicosia, Famagusta and the Bellapais Abbey, where Lord Hayton of Corycus served as a monk.

The prosperity of the inhabitants of Cyprus was brought to a halt by the harsh and corrupt Venetian administration and the iniquitous taxes they imposed. Their tyrannical rule, combined with adverse conditions (droughts, earthquakes, epidemics, famines, floods etc.), caused a noticeable decline in the island's population. According to historian Stephen de Lusignan, by the late Venetian Era, Armenians lived mainly in Famagusta and Nicosia and, in small numbers, at three “Armenian villages”, Platani, Kornokipos and Spathariko.

== Ottoman Era (1570–1878) ==
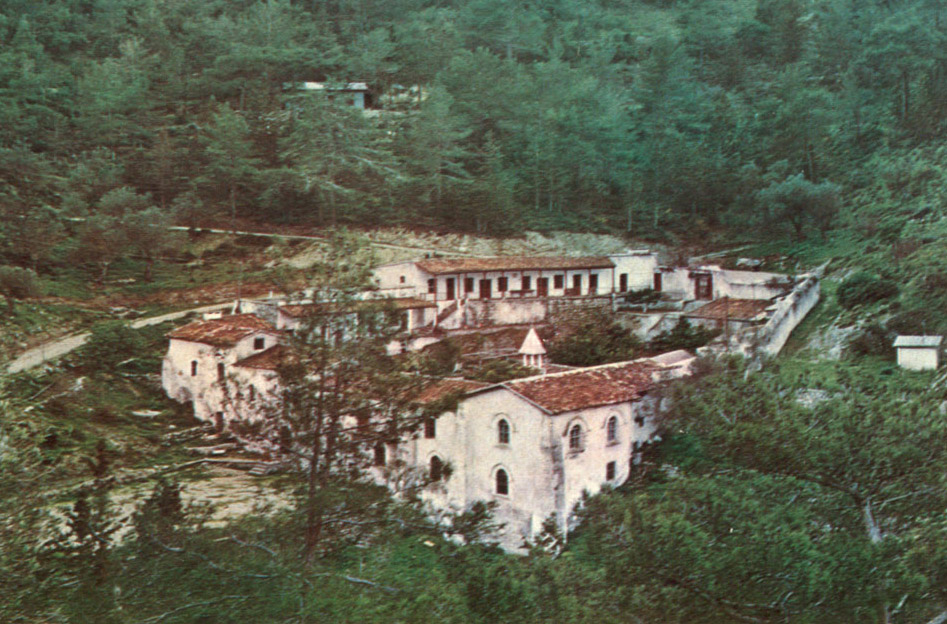
The Magaravank monastery (1967)

During the Ottoman conquest of the island (1570–1571), about 40,000 Ottoman-Armenian craftsmen were recruited, mainly as sappers. The new order of things affected the Armenian community as well: many of the Ottoman Armenians who survived the conquest settled mainly in Nicosia, increasing its Armenian population, while the Armenian Prelature of Cyprus was recognised as an Ethnarchy (Ազգային Իշխանութիւն, Azkayin Ishkhanoutiun), through the millet institution. However, the Bishopric in Famagusta was abolished, as the Christian population was slaughtered or expelled and the entire walled city became forbidden for non-Muslims until the early years of the British Era. As a reward for their services during the conquest, the Armenians of Nicosia were granted the right to guard Paphos Gate (this privilege was used only for a short period, due to the large expenditure required) and, by a firman dated May 1571, they were given back the Notre Dame de Tyre church (also known as Tortosa), which the Ottomans had turned into a salt store. Additionally, the Magaravank monastery had won the favour of the Ottomans and became an important way station for Armenian and other pilgrims en route to the Holy Land, as well as a place of rest for travellers and Catholicoi and other clergymen from Cilicia and Jerusalem.

Contrary to the Latins and the Maronites, Armenians – being Orthodox – were not persecuted because of their religion by the Ottomans. Even though about 20,000 Armenians lived in Cyprus during the very first years of the Ottoman Era, by 1630 only 2,000 Armenians remained, out of a total of 56,530 inhabitants. In the Bedesten (the covered market of Nicosia), there were many Armenian merchants and in the late 18th century/early 19th century Nicosia's leading citizen was an Armenian trader called Sarkis, who was a “beratli” (bearer of a berat or charter granting a privilege) and was initially the dragoman (interpreter) for the French Consul, before becoming the dragoman for the English Consul. Later on, in the early to mid-19th century, travellers and registers mention another rich Armenian merchant, Hadji Symeon Agha of Crimea, who had earlier financed a complete reparation of the Magaravank and was Sarkis' son-in-law. A third Armenian notable was Mardiros Fugas, dragoman for the French Consul and a well-known trader, who was arrested and beheaded by the Ottomans circa 1825. Gifted with the acumen of industry, Armenians practised lucrative professions and in the beginning of the 17th century Persian Armenians settled in Cyprus as silk traders, as did some affluent Ottoman-Armenians in the 18th and 19th centuries, such as Boghos-Berge Agha Eramian. However, with the new order of things, the number of Armenians and other Christians dramatically declined due to the onerous taxation and the harshness of the Ottoman administration, compelling many Christians to become Linobambaki (Crypto-Christians) or to embrace Islam, which explains why former Armenian villages (Armenokhori, Artemi, Ayios Iakovos, Ayios Khariton, Kornokipos, Melounda, Platani and Spathariko) were inhabited by “Turkish-Cypriots” at the end of the 19th century; a few Armenian-Cypriots became Catholics through marriage with affluent Latin families.

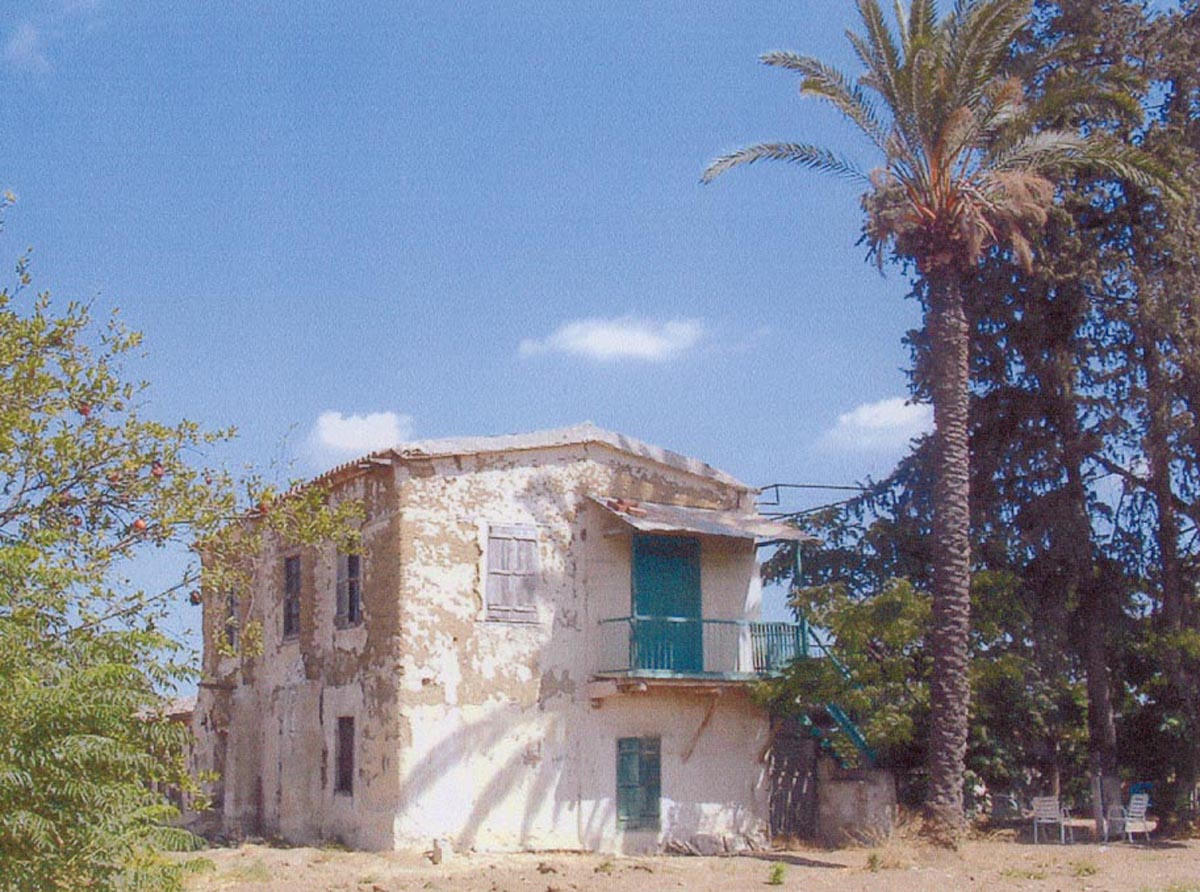
The Eramian Farm House in Dheftera

Gradually, after the bloody 1821 events – when, as a response to the Cypriot support to the Greek Revolution, the Ottomans destroyed the Armenian and Greek mansions, prohibited Greeks, Franks, Armenians and Maronites from carrying guns and hanged or massacred 470 notables, amongst them the Armenian parish priest of Nicosia, der Bedros – some improvements were observed during the Tanzimat period (1839–1876). In the spirit of the Hatt-ı Şerif of Gülhane (1839), the Armenian Bishop, the Greek Archbishop and the Maronite Suffragan Bishop participated in the Administrative Council (Meclis İdare), which was formed in 1840. After 1850, some Armenians were employed in the civil service, while in 1860 the Armenian church of Nicosia became amongst the first in Cyprus to have a belfry – donated by Constantinopolitan Armenian Hapetig Nevrouzian. Additionally, the opening of the Suez Canal in 1869 benefited the Armenian and other merchants of the island, while in 1870 the first Armenian school was established in Nicosia by newly arrived Archimandrite Vartan Mamigonian. Furthermore, as a result of the Hatt-ı Hümayun in 1856, the administrative autonomy of the Armenian Prelature of Cyprus was officially recognised.

Throughout the Ottoman Era, the vast majority of the Armenian population of Cyprus had been Armenian Orthodox, although there is also mention of a small Armenian Catholic community in Larnaca. Of the three religious groups, the Armenians are the only ones to have a continuous presence of prelates throughout the Ottoman period. Based on various estimates, the Armenian-Cypriot community of the 19th century numbered between 150 and 250 persons, the majority of whom lived in Nicosia, with smaller numbers living in Famagusta, Larnaca, the north and south of the capital (especially in Dheftera and Kythrea) and, naturally, around the Magaravank.

== British Era (1878–1960) ==
With the arrival of the British in July 1878 and their progressive administration, the already prosperous yet small Armenian community of the island was particularly strengthened. Known for their linguistic skills, several Armenians were contracted to Cyprus to work as interpreters and public servants at the consulates and the British administration, such as Apisoghom Utidjian – the official state translator and interpreter for Ottoman Turkish between 1878 and 1919. The number of Armenians in Cyprus significantly increased following the massive deportations, the massacres and the genocide perpetrated by the Ottomans and the Young Turks (1894–1896, 1909 & 1915–1923). Cyprus welcomed over 10,000 refugees from Cilicia, Smyrna and Constantinople, who arrived in Larnaca and all its other harbours, some by chance, others by intent; about 1,500 of them made the island their new home. Industrious, cultivated and progressive, they brought new life into the old community and did not need long to find their feet and establish themselves as people of the arts, letters and sciences, entrepreneurs and merchants, craftsmen and photographers, as well as professionals who introduced new crafts, dishes and sweets to the island, thus contributing to Cyprus' socioeconomic and cultural development.

The newcomers established associations, choirs, sports groups, Scout groups, bands, churches, schools and cemeteries in Nicosia, Larnaca, Limassol, Famagusta, Amiandos and elsewhere, while soon Armenophony became a reality. Armenians were the first locksmiths, mechanics, seat, comb and stamp makers, upholsterers, watchmakers and zincographers in Cyprus. They were the first to introduce the cinema, they significantly improved the craft of shoemaking and it was Armenians who first introduced Armenian bastourma, baklava, dried apricots, gassosa, gyros, halva, ice cubes, koubes, lahmadjoun, lokmadhes and pompes into the Cypriot cuisine – all very popular today. Armenians also introduced two techniques of embroidery needlework: the Aintab work (Այնթապի գործ) and the Marash work (Մարաշի գործ). There were also some Armenian factory owners (ice makers, soap makers, sock makers, tanners etc.), but above all, there was a disproportionately large number of Armenian photographers.

Law-abiding by nature, Armenian-Cypriots always had a high-profile with the British administration and many became conscientious civil servants and disciplined policemen or were employed at the Cyprus Government Railway and at Cable and Wireless. Throughout the 1920s–1950s, many worked at the asbestos mines at Amiandos and the copper mines at Mavrovouni and Skouriotissa, some of whom had been trade unionists. Some Armenian-Cypriots participated in the 1897 Greco-Turkish War, the two World Wars (1914–1918 – at the Cyprus Muleteers' Corps – & 1939–1945 – both at the Cyprus Regiment and the Cyprus Volunteer Force) and the EOKA liberation struggle (1955–1959). Also, the Eastern Legion (later called Armenian Legion) was formed and trained between December 1916 and May 1918 in Monarga village, near Boghazi, consisting of over 4,000 Diasporan Armenian volunteers who fought against the Ottoman Empire. Some Armenian refugees arrived from Palestine (1947–1949) and Egypt (1956–1957).

Following negotiations in September and October 1916, between Boghos Noubar Pasha and French military and political authorities, the Eastern Legion (Légion d'Orient/Արեւելեան Լեգէոն) was officially established in Cairo in November 1916, by a special charter signed by the French Minister of War, General Pierre August Roques. It was to be an auxiliary unit of the French Army, consisting mainly of Armenian volunteers, whose aim was to liberate Cilicia from the Ottoman Empire, for the purpose of creating an independent Armenian state in that region. After negotiations with the British authorities, within the framework of the Anglo-French intelligence co-operation, it was decided that the training of the volunteers (կամաւորներ=gamavorner) would take place at Monarga, in the Carpass peninsula of Cyprus, near Boghaz. The Legion would be administered by French officers.

The camp was built in December 1916 by Armenian Genocide refugees and the arrival of the first volunteers – refugees from Musa Dagh – started in January 1917. Throughout 1917 and 1918, volunteers arrived at Famagusta harbor from the harbours of Marseille and Port Said. Several Armenian organisations in the Middle East, Europe and North America supported the Legion, either with financial contributions or by drafting Diasporan Armenians to form companies of the Legion. The selection and training were rather strict, while the exceeding difficulties and large costs of transportation hindered the arrival of more volunteers from the New World. The volunteers were especially impatient to perform their patriotic duty.

The camp consisted of the headquarters, the barracks, various auxiliary installations (including a water basin) and a small church. In total, there were 4,124 volunteers, who formed 3 Armenian battalions, as well as 2 Syrian companies (consisting of about 300 men). The camp's commander was Infantry Lieutenant Colonel Louis Romieu, while its spiritual shepherd was Archbishop Taniel Hagopian, assisted by Archimandrite Krikor Bahlavouni, who later became known as “Topal Vartabed” (Թոփալ Վարդապետ=Lame Archimandrite), because of an injury he suffered during his military service. Both clergymen came to Cyprus from the Armenian Patriarchate of Jerusalem, even though at the time the Armenian Prelature of Cyprus was under the Armenian Patriarchate of Constantinople.

In addition to their duties in Cyprus, at some point, the defence of Castellorizo island (to the east of Rhodes) was handed to the Armenian Legion. Basic training was completed by May 1918. Until then, the 1st battalion had about a year and a half of training, the 2nd battalion about eight months and the third battalion was being formed. Then, the largest part of the Legion was moved to Egypt and thence it was deployed to Palestine, marking the Battle of Arara on 19 September 1918. The 3rd battalion left Cyprus in October 1918. In December 1918 the Legion – consisting now of 4 battalions, 4,368 soldiers and 66 officers – settled in the Cilicia region (with its headquarters located in Adana) as part of the French Mandate, where it remained until it was dissolved in August 1920. In February 1919 it was officially called “Armenian Legion” (Légion Arménienne/Հայկական Լեգէոն). In mid-1919, General Antranik Ozanian came to Cyprus, wanting to go to Cilicia in order to head the Legion, but this was denied by the French. After its dissolution, only a very small number of legionnaires returned to Cyprus.

In the Armenian cemetery of Larnaca there is a group grave of 9 volunteers of the Armenian Legion, commissioned by the French consulate in the late 1940s. In the location where the Legion's camp once was, presently in the Turkish-occupied areas, very few vestiges remain.

The Armenian-Cypriot community prospered throughout the British Era (1878–1960), by establishing associations, choirs, Scout groups, sports teams, musical ensembles, churches, cemeteries and schools, including the renowned Melkonian Educational Institute. In many ways unique across the whole Armenian Diaspora, it was built just outside Nicosia between 1924 and 1926, after the generous and benevolent donation of the Egyptian-Armenian tobacco trading brothers Krikor and Garabed Melkonian, initially in order to shelter and educate 500 orphans of the Genocide, who planted the trees in front of the school in memory of their slaughtered relatives. From an orphanage (1926–1940), it gradually became a world-renowned secondary school with a boarding section (1934–2005).

Examining the population censuses of the British Era (see Demography section), we observe a steady increase in the number of Armenians in Cyprus, ranging from 201 in 1881 to 4,549 in 1956. In their vast majority, they were Armenian Apostolic, but there was also a small number of Armenian Catholics and Armenian Protestants. In the 1960 population census, 3,628 Armenians were recorded – in contrast to 4,549 in 1956 – as about 900 Armenian-Cypriots had emigrated to Great Britain, Australia and elsewhere, not only because of the difficult economic conditions of the time, but mainly due to the emergency situation caused by the EOKA liberation struggle (1955–1959) and the uncertainty that some felt with the departure of the British, whom they viewed as their protectors. In fact, a large portion of British-Armenians hail from Cyprus.

== Independence era (1960–present) ==
The end of the EOKA liberation struggle (1955–1959) found Armenian-Cypriots having forged strong bonds with the rest of the Cypriots. The 1960 Independence brought a new era for the Armenians of Cyprus, who – together with the Maronites and the Latins – were recognised as a “religious group” by the Constitution (Article 2 § 3) and were now represented by an elected Representative – initially a member of the Greek Communal Chamber (Article 109) and, since 1965, a member of the House of Representatives (Law 12/1965). The size of the community, however, had been reduced because of the emigration of about 900 Armenian-Cypriots to the United Kingdom, due to the emergency situation caused by the EOKA liberation struggle (1955–1959) and the poor state of the local economy. A second factor that contributed to the reduction of the community's size was the emigration of about 600 Armenian-Cypriots to Soviet Armenia, as part of the Panarmenian movement for “repatriation” during the 1962–1964 period (nerkaght).

During the 1963–1964 inter-communal troubles, the Armenian-Cypriot community suffered major losses, as the Armenian quarter of Nicosia was captured by Turkish Cypriots. Taken were the Prelature building, the mediaeval Virgin Mary church, the Melikian-Ouzounian school, the Genocide Monument, the club houses of the Armenian Club, AYMA and Armenian General Benevolent Union (AGBU), as well as the Armenian Evangelical church; also taken was the mediaeval Ganchvor Church in Famagusta. In total, 231 Armenian-Cypriot families became victims to the Turks and/or lost their shops and enterprises. As a result, hundreds of Armenian-Cypriots left for Great Britain, Canada, Australia and the United States. After the 1974 Turkish invasion, the Armenian-Cypriot community suffered additional losses: 4–5 families living in Kyrenia, about 30 families in Nicosia and 40–45 families in Famagusta became refugees, while an Armenian-Cypriot lady (Rosa Bakalian) has been missing since then; the renowned Magaravank monastery in Pentadhaktylos was taken by the Turkish troops, the Melkonian boys' dormitory was bombed by the Turkish Air Force, while the Ayios Dhometios Armenian cemetery was hit by mortars and fell within the buffer zone. As a result, dozens of Armenian-Cypriots emigrated, mainly to Great Britain – in total, about 1,300 Armenian-Cypriots left Cyprus in the 1960s and 1970s, in addition to those who emigrated to Soviet Armenia.

The nerkaght [ներգաղթ=repatriation, also known as հայրենադարձութիւն (hayrenatartsoutiun=home-coming)] movement was a Panarmenian migration movement of Diasporan Armenians to Soviet Armenia, within the framework of a co-ordinated attempt of the Armenian SSR and the Church of Armenia to strengthen their claims on historical Armenia's territory, appealing to the patriotic sentiments of Armenians in the Diaspora; especially after World War II, nerkaght was also a way to partially replace the large number of Armenians who perished during the War. Massive propaganda took place, in co-operation with the AGBU and the Ramgavar party, arousing a storm of enthusiasm in the Armenian communities of the Diaspora and creating high expectations for their settling in the “homeland”, which they perceived as their ultimate destination. In retrospect, nerkaght could also be considered as Soviet manoeuvre in the Cold War era.

Nerkaght's waves took place in 1921–1925 (19,688 people), 1926–1929, 1932–1933, 1936 (22,598), 1946–1949 (the largest wave, with 89,780 repatriates) and 1962–1982 (31,920 people), when 163,986 Armenians in total migrated to Soviet Armenia from Iran, Greece, Syria, Lebanon, Iraq, France, Bulgaria, Egypt, Turkey, Romania, Palestine, Jordan, Cyprus, the United States, Great Britain, Argentina, China, Israel and elsewhere.

Between 1944 and 1948, there was the Friends of Armenia Association [Հայաստանի Բարեկամաց Միութիւն (Hayastani Paregamats Mioutiun)], which was established by AGBU and Ramgavar party supporters, with the purpose of promoting love for the Soviet “homeland” and the acquaintance with its culture. Other than the various other sports, cultural, social, charity and other events, there was massive propaganda in favour of the nerkaght movement, including articles in the association's “Nor Arax” newspaper, as well as in the Greek-Cypriot communist “Dimokratis” newspaper, lectures and other events. Despite the opposition of the Dashnaktsoutiun party and the colonial government, about 2,000 Armenian-Cypriots had registered; in the end, however, Armenians from poorer countries of the Middle East and the Balkans were preferred. However, there were 4–5 individual Armenian-Cypriot families who emigrated to Soviet Armenia on their own in 1947.

With the announcement of the new wave of nerkaght in 1961, the AGBU and the Ramgavar party started over an even more massive propaganda in favour of “repatriation”. Lectures, film screenings and radio broadcasts were organised, speakers from Soviet Armenia were hosted, which was visited by an Armenian-Cypriot delegation – which later on presented its impressions both in speeches and in the “Henaran” newspaper. Propaganda in favour of nerkaght was also in the left-wing Greek-Cypriot “Haravgi” newspaper, as well at the Melkonian Educational Institute. On the other hand, there was strong opposition on the part of the Dashnaktsoutiun party, for both ideological and pragmatic reasons. As a result, 576 Armenian-Cypriots in total were repatriated to Soviet Armenia between 1962 and 1964 (amounting to about 15% of the community at the time). From Famagusta's harbour 20 left on 19 September 1962 (with the “Felix Dzerzhinsky” steamship), 373 on 3 October 1962 (with the “Gruzia” steamship), 168 on 19 October 1963 (with the “Litva” steamship) and 15 on 4 September 1964 (with the “Odessa” steamship). Most of them settled in Girovagan (Vanatsor), with a smaller number settling in Leninagan (Guymri). Over the years, some of them managed to re-settle in Yerevan.

Coupled with the exodus of about 900 Armenian-Cypriots to the United Kingdom, Australia, Canada and the United States during the EOKA emergency (1955–1959), the further emigration of about 600 Armenian-Cypriots to Soviet Armenia brought about a significant reduction to the size of the community, by about a third. Families were divided (not simply ideologically – but also physically), important members of the community were no longer part of it, while unrest was hovering over the future of the community – especially after the 1963–1964 intercommunal violence and the ousting of Armenian-Cypriots from their ancient quarter in Nicosia.

Additionally, as news of the emigrants' bad living and financial conditions finally arrived in Cyprus (through coded letters or photographs – due to Soviet censorship -, as well as from visitors to/from Soviet Armenia), there was a sense of bitterness over the whole situation, as well as further rivalry between Dashnaktsoutiun (favouring a free and an independent Armenia) and anti-Dashnaktsoutiun organisations (supporting or, at least, settling with a Soviet Armenia). The latter also lost a number of supporters, as most of the emigrants were affiliated with AGBU and/or Ramgavar. Finally, Dashnaktsoutiun gained more sympathisers in some disillusioned AGBU and/or Ramgavar supporters.

Disappointed by what they saw and lived through, almost all of the ones who went to Soviet Armenia wanted to return to Cyprus from the start, as they were not accustomed to that kind of life. Due to restrictions from the Soviet regime, in order to come back, a large number of them moved to Baku, Azerbaijan. The adventurous return started in 1967 and continued until 2005, although most of them came during the late 1980s (after the Spitak earthquake) and the early 1990s (after the dissolution of the Soviet Union). In fact, the first wave of Armenians from Armenia who came to Cyprus after 1991 were mostly Armenian-Cypriots who had migrated to Soviet Armenia in the 1960s and their spouses/descendants. Their lives have been indelibly marked, also creating a sort of “identity crisis”: in Cyprus they are considered “Hayastantsi” (Armenians from Armenia), while in Armenia they were considered “Gibratsi” (Cypriots) or “Gibrahay” (Armenians from Cyprus).

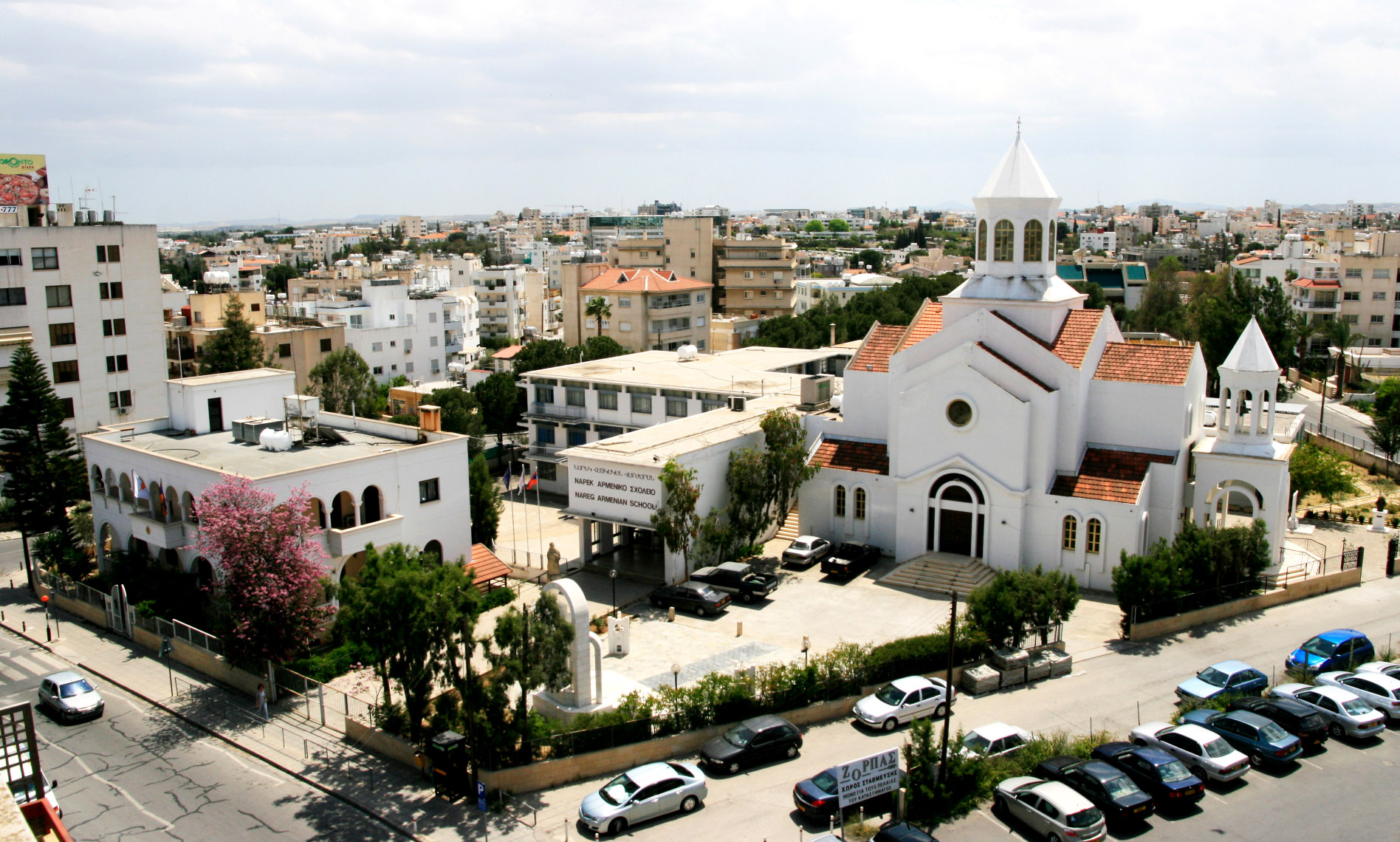
The Armenian compound in Strovolos, Nicosia

With the unfailing support of the government, the small yet industrious Armenian community of Cyprus gradually managed to recover from its losses and continued to prosper in the remaining urban areas, contributing culturally and socioeconomically to the development of its homeland. On 24 April 1975, Cyprus became the first European country (and the second worldwide, after Uruguay) to recognise the Armenian genocide with Resolution 36/1975; two more resolutions followed, Resolution 74/1982 and Resolution 103/1990, with the latter declaring 24 April as National Remembrance Day of the Armenian Genocide in Cyprus. Over the past decades, the dynamics of the Armenian-Cypriot community have changed with the increased number of marriages with Greek-Cypriots and other non-Armenians, and the arrival over the last 30–35 years of thousands of Armenian political and economic immigrants because of the civil war in Lebanon (1975–1990), the insurgencies in Syria (1976–1982), the Islamic revolution in Iran and the Iran–Iraq War (1978–1988), as well as after the Spitak earthquake (1988) and the dissolution of the Soviet Union (1991); some of them have settled permanently in Cyprus. According to the European Charter for Regional or Minority Languages of the Council of Europe, the Armenian language – the mother tongue of the vast majority of Armenian-Cypriots – was recognised as a minority language of Cyprus as of 1 December 2002. Today, it is estimated that Armenians living in Cyprus number over 3,500 persons; other than the countries mentioned above, in Cyprus there is also a small number of Armenians coming from Ethiopia, Greece, Kuwait, Turkey and the United Kingdom.
