= Vasilis Michaelides =

Cypriot poet (1849–1917)

Vasilis Michaelides Βασίλης Μιχαηλίδης
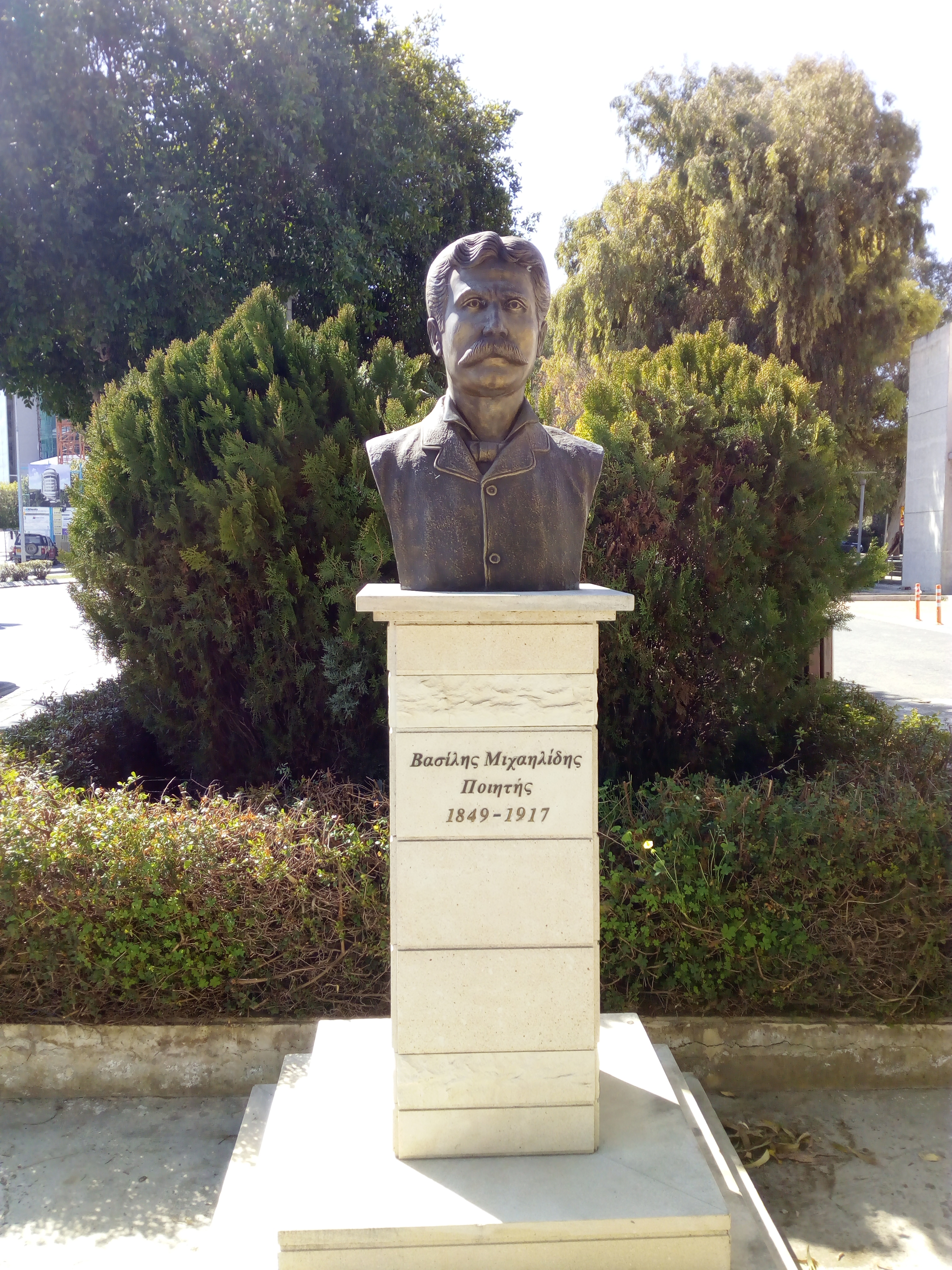
- Bust of Michaelides in Strovolos
- Born: c. 1849; Lefkoniko, Ottoman Cyprus
- Died: 18 December 1917; Limassol, British Cyprus
- Occupation: Poet
- Writing career
- Period: 1873–1915

Vasilis Michaelides (Greek: Βασίλης Μιχαηλίδης; c. 1849 – 18 December 1917) was a Greek Cypriot poet who is considered by many to be the national poet of Cyprus.

== Early life ==
Michaelides was born in Lefkoniko c. 1849. In 1862, he moved to Nicosia to attend school. His first contact with the arts came in the form of religious icons in the archbishopric in Nicosia, where he trained as an artist.

== Career ==
Michaelides moved to the Diocese of Larnaca, where he concentrated on painting in the care of his uncle. In 1873, he published his first poems Usury (Greek: Η Τοκογλυφία) and Nightingales and Owls (Greek: Αηδόνια και Κουκουβάγιες). In 1875, he moved to Naples for further studies in painting. He left Italy in 1877 and went to Greece, where he enlisted as a volunteer in the Greek Army and fought for the liberation of Thessaly during the Greco-Turkish War of 1897. With the end of Ottoman rule of Cyprus in 1878, he returned to the island and settled in Limassol, staying at the local premises of the Diocese of Larnaca. There he began to write for the local newspaper Alithia (Greek: Αλήθεια; Truth).

Michaelides wrote several poems in Greek dialects such as Cypriot, Dhimotiki, and Katharevousa. His first poetry collection, The Weak Lyre (Greek: Η Ασθενής Λύρα), was published in 1882. In 1884, he was appointed to work as a nurse, which secured him an income, food, and a place to live. He then began to write for the newspaper Salpinga (Greek: Σάλπιγγα Clarion). In 1888, he began the publication of the satirical magazine Diavolos (Greek: Διάβολος Devil).

In 1883, Michaelides wrote The Fairy (Greek: Η Ανεράδα), followed by his most famous work The 9th of July 1821 (Greek: Η 9η Ιουλίου 1821), a poem in the Cypriot dialect detailing the events leading to the execution of the Greek Cypriot leadership, including Archbishop Kyprianos, by the Ottoman rulers of the time:

Ἀντάν κ̌ί' ἀρκέψαν οἱ κρυφοί ἀνέμοι κ̌ί' ἐφυσούσαν
κ̌ί' ἀρκίνησεν εἴς τήν Τουρκ̌ιάν νά κρυφοσυνεφκιάζη
κ̌αί πού τές τέσσερεις μερκές τά νέφη ἐκουβαλούσαν,
ώστι νά κάμουν τόν κ̌αιρόν ν' ἀρκεύκη νά στοιβάζη,
εἴχ̌εν σγιάν εἴχαν οὕλοι τοῦς κ̌ι ἡ Ǩύπρου τό κρυφόν τῆς
μέσ' στοῦς ἀνέμους τοῦς κρυφούς εἴχ̌εν τό μερτικόν τῆς.
κ̌ί' ἀντάν ἐφάνην ἡ στραπή εἴς τοῦ Μοριά τά μέρη
κ̌ί' ἐξάπλωσεν κ̌ι' ἀκούστηκεν παντού ἡ πουμπουρκά τῆς,
κ̌ί' οὕλα ξηλαμπρακ̌ίσασιν κ̌αί θάλασσα κ̌αί ξέρη
εἴχ̌εν σγιάν εἴχαν οὕλοι τοῦς κ̌ἰ' ἡ Ǩύπρου τά κακά τῆς.

— From Ἑννάτη Ἰουλίου, Βασίλης Μιχαηλίδη

Michaelides' poetry helped establish the Cypriot dialect as a linguistic medium for written poetry. The 9th of July was followed by The Woman From Chios (Greek: Η Χιώτισσα).

== Final poems and death ==
The latter part of Michaelides' life was plagued by his struggles with alcoholism. In 1910, he lost his job as a nurse, but the Limassol Municipality gave him a new job as a health inspector and a room to stay in at the town hall. In 1911, he published Poems (Greek: Ποιήματα). By 1915, he had ended up at the Limassol poorhouse, where he wrote The Dream of the Greek (Greek: Το όρομαν του Ρωμιού). He died a penniless alcoholic on 18 December 1917.

== Legacy ==
Michaelides is considered by many to be the national poet of Cyprus. In 1978, his portrait was depicted on one of a series of stamps themed on Cypriot poets. There are also a number of streets in Cyprus named after him, as is the 10th Primary School of Limassol. There is a bust of him in Strovolos and another bust of him in Limassol outside the Library of the Cyprus University of Technology, which is also named after him.
