= Geçitkale Air Base =

Air base in Northern Cyprus

Geçitkale Air Base Geçitkale Havaalanı Αεροπορική Βάση Λευκόνοικου
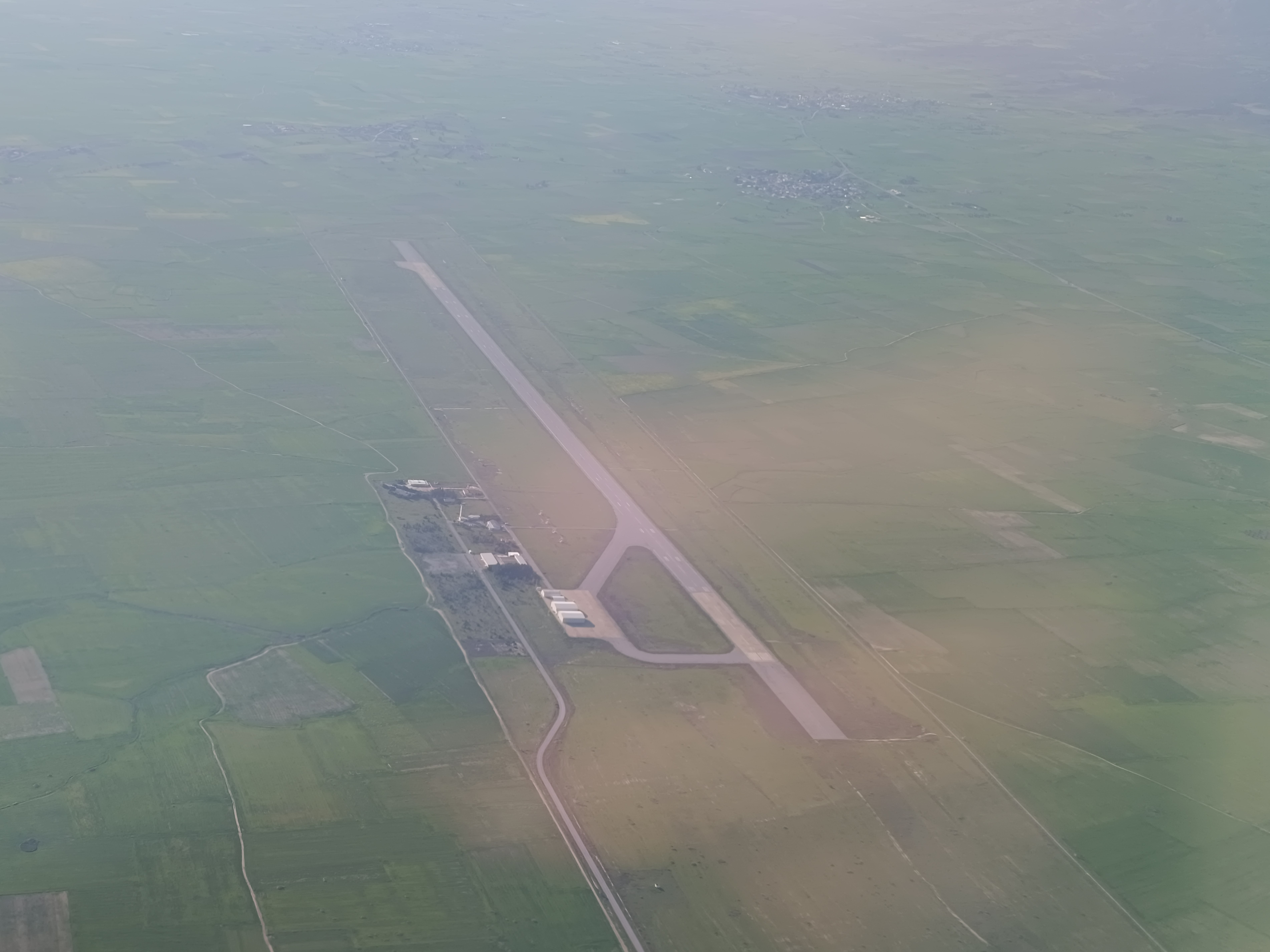
- Aerial view of the airfield
- IATA: GEC; ICAO: LCGK

Summary
- Elevation AMSL: 143 ft / 44 m
- Coordinates: 35°14′00″N 33°43′58″E

Map

Runways
Direction	Length		Surface
Direction	ft	m	Surface
09/27	9,350	2,850	Composite

Geçitkale Air Base or Lefkoniko Airport (IATA: GEC, ICAO: LCGK) is a military airfield of the Turkish Air Force near Lefkoniko (Turkish: Geçitkale) in Northern Cyprus. Construction was completed around 1990. During the renovation of the Ercan International Airport between September 2002 and May 2004, it served as Northern Cyprus' primary civilian airport. Geçitkale's unofficial ICAO code is LCGK.

In the summer of 1998, amid rising tensions between Greece and Turkey, Turkey briefly stationed six F-16s at Geçitkale, in response to the former's positioning of four F-16s and two Lockheed C-130 Hercules at Paphos. Combat aircraft last visited the airport in November 2000.

== Aerodrome characteristics ==
Geçitkale's only runway, 09/27, measures 2,850 m (9,350 ft) in length and 45 m (148 ft) wide. In addition, there is a 285 m (935 ft) long stopway on either end. The airport is equipped with a VOR/DME and an NDB station.

== Base for unmanned aerial vehicles ==
Geçitkale Air Base was assigned by a decision of the government of Northern Cyprus to the Cyprus Turkish Peace Force Command for use by unmanned aerial vehicle (UAV) operations.

Firstly, three-truck load of ground control unit was installed at the air base. In the morning hours of 16 December 2019, a military UAV of type Bayraktar TB2 landed at the air base coming from Turkey. The UAVs are intended to provide protection to the Turkish vessels operating in the Eastern Mediterranean Sea for oil and gas exploration and deepwater drilling for petroleum and natural gas.
