= Platani, Cyprus =

Platani: Πλατάνι (Greek); Çınarlı (Turkish)
- Location within Cyprus
- Coordinates: 35°19′59″N 33°45′06″E
- Country (de jure): Cyprus
  - District: Famagusta District
- Country (de facto): Northern Cyprus
  - District: Gazimağusa District

Population (2011)
  - Total: 183

Platani (Greek: Πλατάνι; Turkish: Çınarlı, meaning "a place with platanus", previously known as Bladan) is a village in the Famagusta District of Cyprus, situated 9 kilometers (5.6 mi) north of Lefkoniko. Under the de facto control of Northern Cyprus, Platani is a Turkish Cypriot community with a population of 183 as of 2011. The village is renowned locally for its proximity to the stalactite cave known as "Incirli Mağra".
