= St. Catherine's Church, Limassol =

St. Catherine's Church
- Church of St. Catherine of Alexandria
- Εκκλησία της Αγίας Αικατερίνης
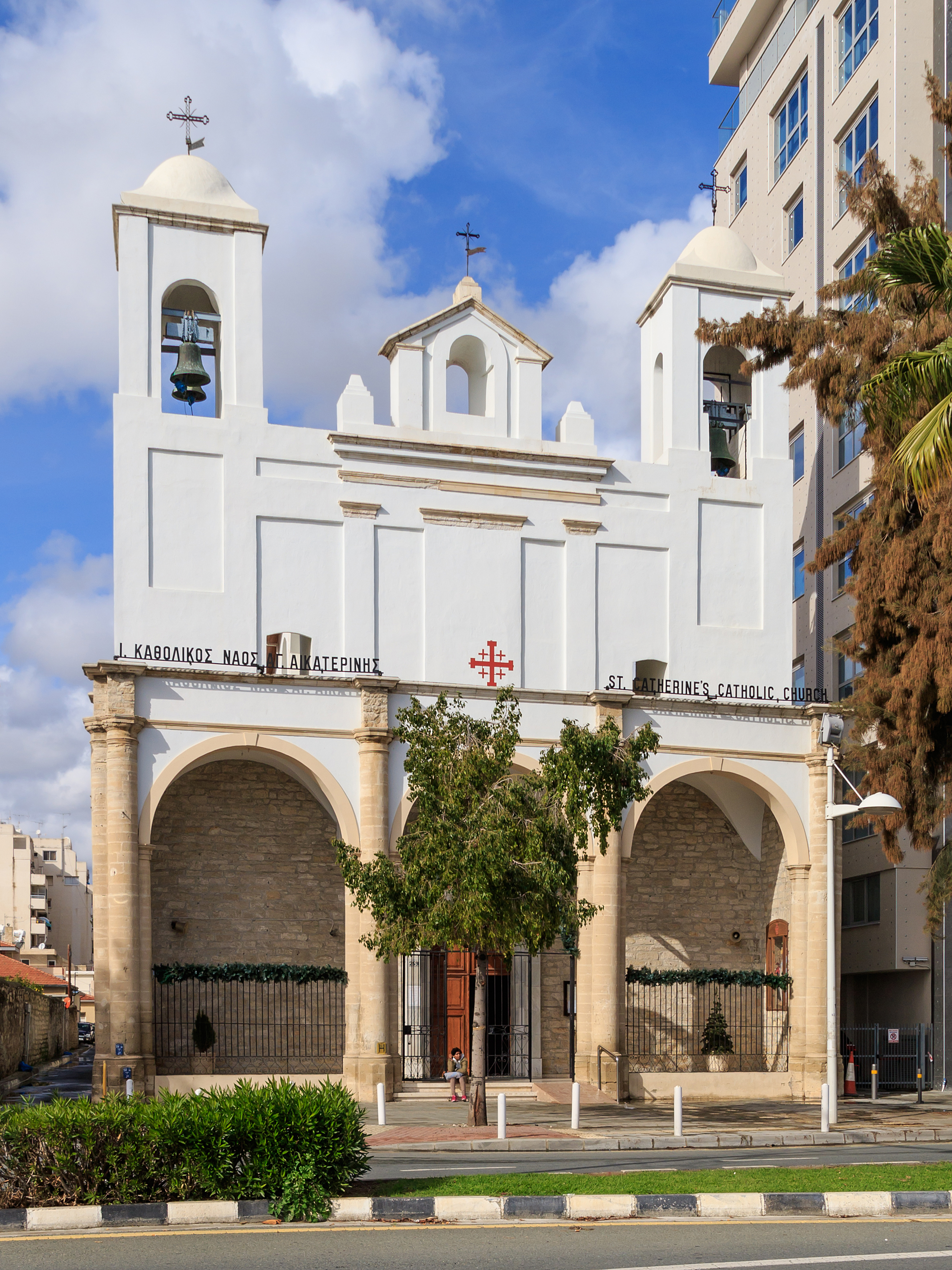
- Front view of the church
- St. Catherine's Church
- Location: Limassol
- Country: Cyprus
- Denomination: Roman Catholic Church
- Sui iuris church: Latin Church

Architecture
- Functional status: Active
- Architect: Francesco da Monghidoro
- Style: Baroque
- Completed: 1879; 147 years ago

Administration
- Diocese: Latin Patriarchate of Jerusalem

St. Catherine's Church (Greek: Εκκλησία της Αγίας Αικατερίνης, romanized: Ekklēsía tēs Agías Aikaterínēs) also known more formally Church of St. Catherine of Alexandria is a parish of the Roman Catholic Church in Limassol, Cyprus. It falls under the authority of the Latin Patriarchate of Jerusalem.

== History ==
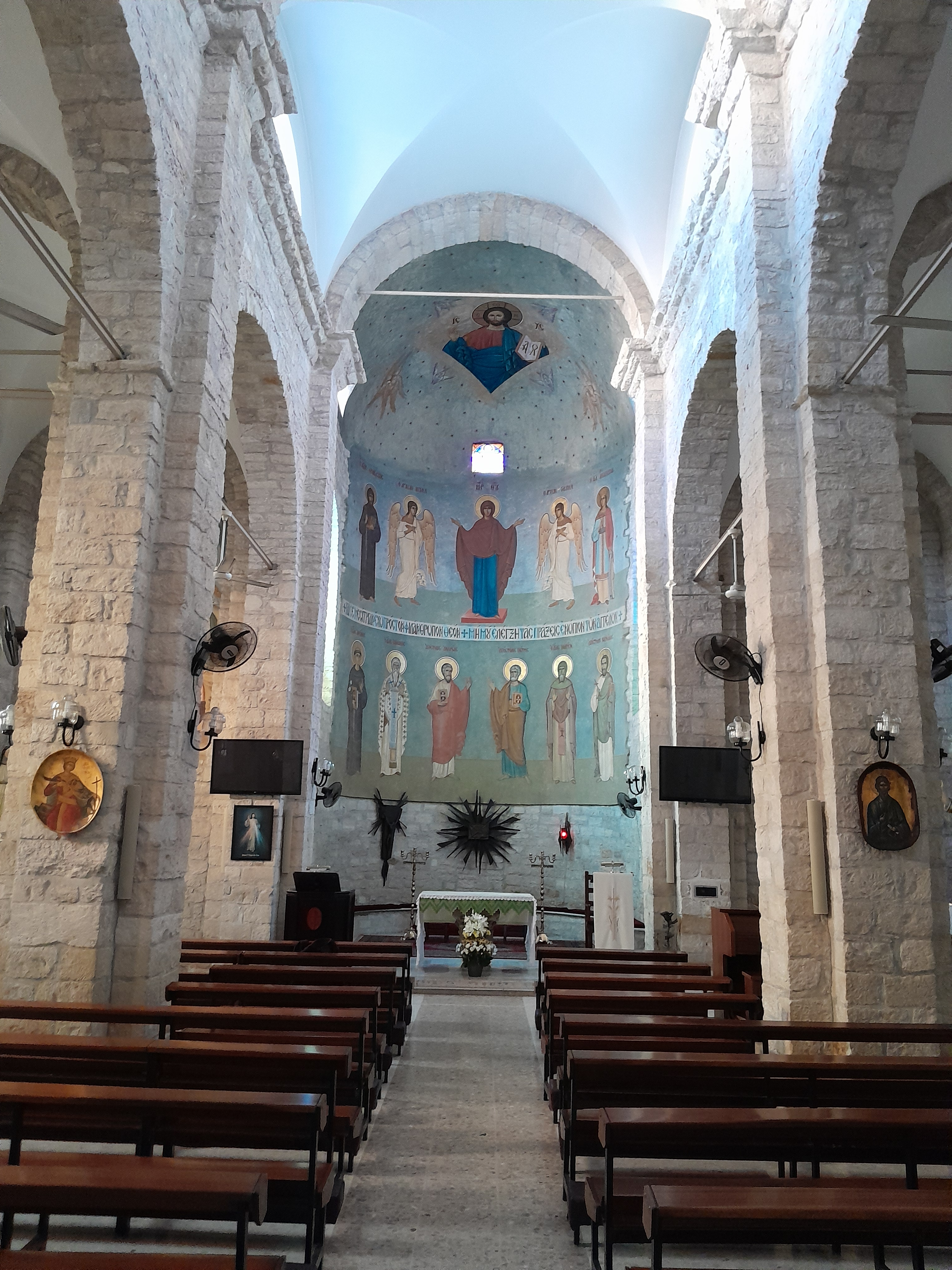
Interior

The church, a three-aisle church with a baroque interior, was built between 1872 and 1879, and was officially opened on the day of the feast of St. Catherine, on 25 November, with the presence of foreign delegations and Governor of British Cyprus. It was designed by Francesco da Monghidoro, an Italian Franciscan. It underwent a restoration in 1979.

Religious services are given in Greek and English.

== See also ==
- Catholic Church in Cyprus
