= Church of the Holy Cross, Nicosia =

Coordinates: 35.1741°N 33.3574°E

Church of the Holy Cross
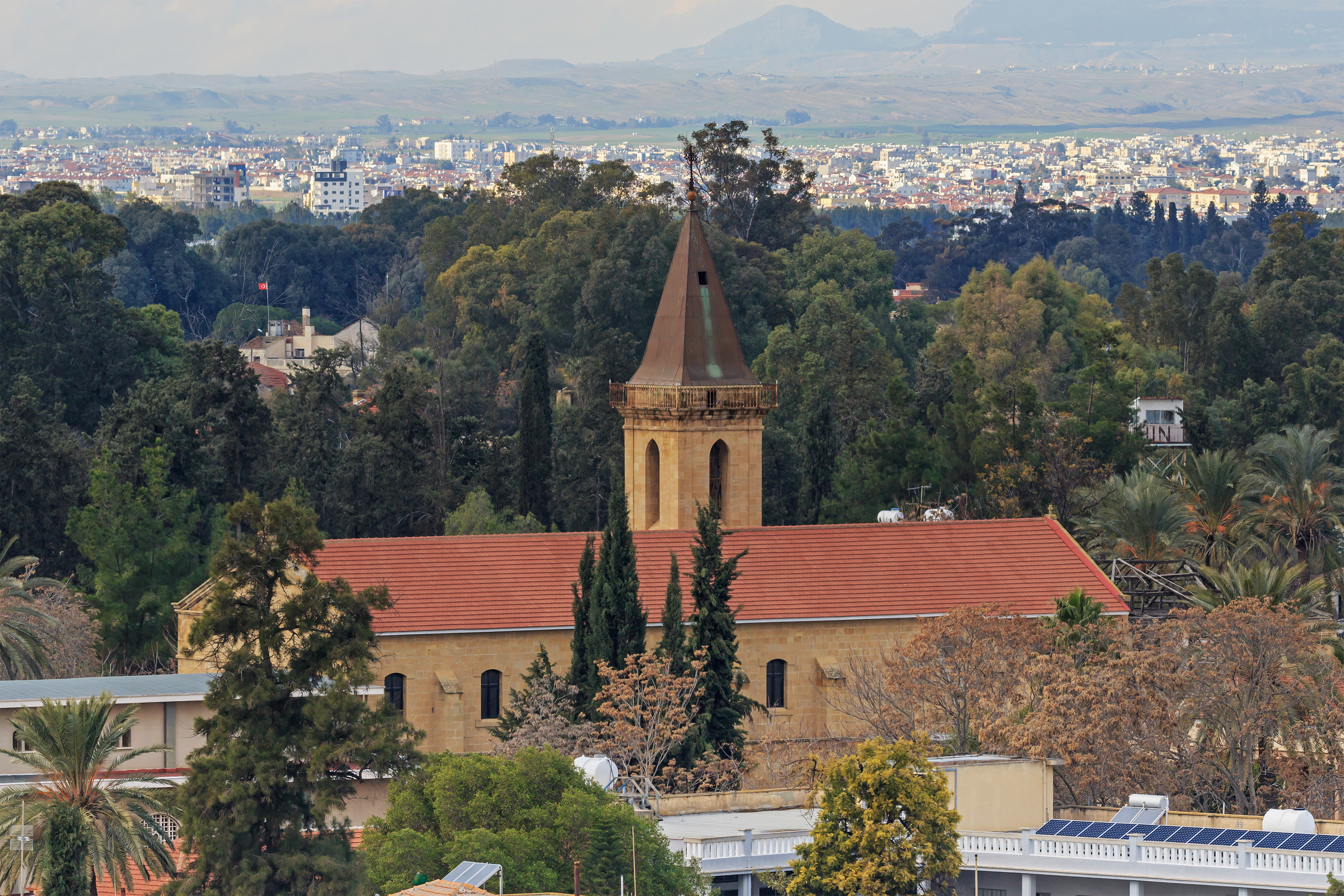
- Church of the Holy Cross
- Location: Nicosia
- Country: Cyprus
- Denomination: Roman Catholic Church

History
- Founded: 1902

The Church of the Holy Cross is a Roman Catholic parish located in the city of Nicosia in Cyprus.

The first church dedicated to the Holy Cross was built in 1642 and operated continuously until the late nineteenth century. In April 1900 a new church dedicated to the Holy Cross was financially supported in part by the Spanish Royal Family and partly by the Franciscan friars of the Custody of the Holy Land. Its formal inauguration took place in 1902. It also has a friary which was rebuilt in 1959. Part of the access to the garden was blocked as a consequence of the Cyprus crisis of 1963–64 and the war of 1974, as the church sits in the buffer zone between Nicosia and North Nicosia.

The parish sits within the Latin Patriarchate of Jerusalem.

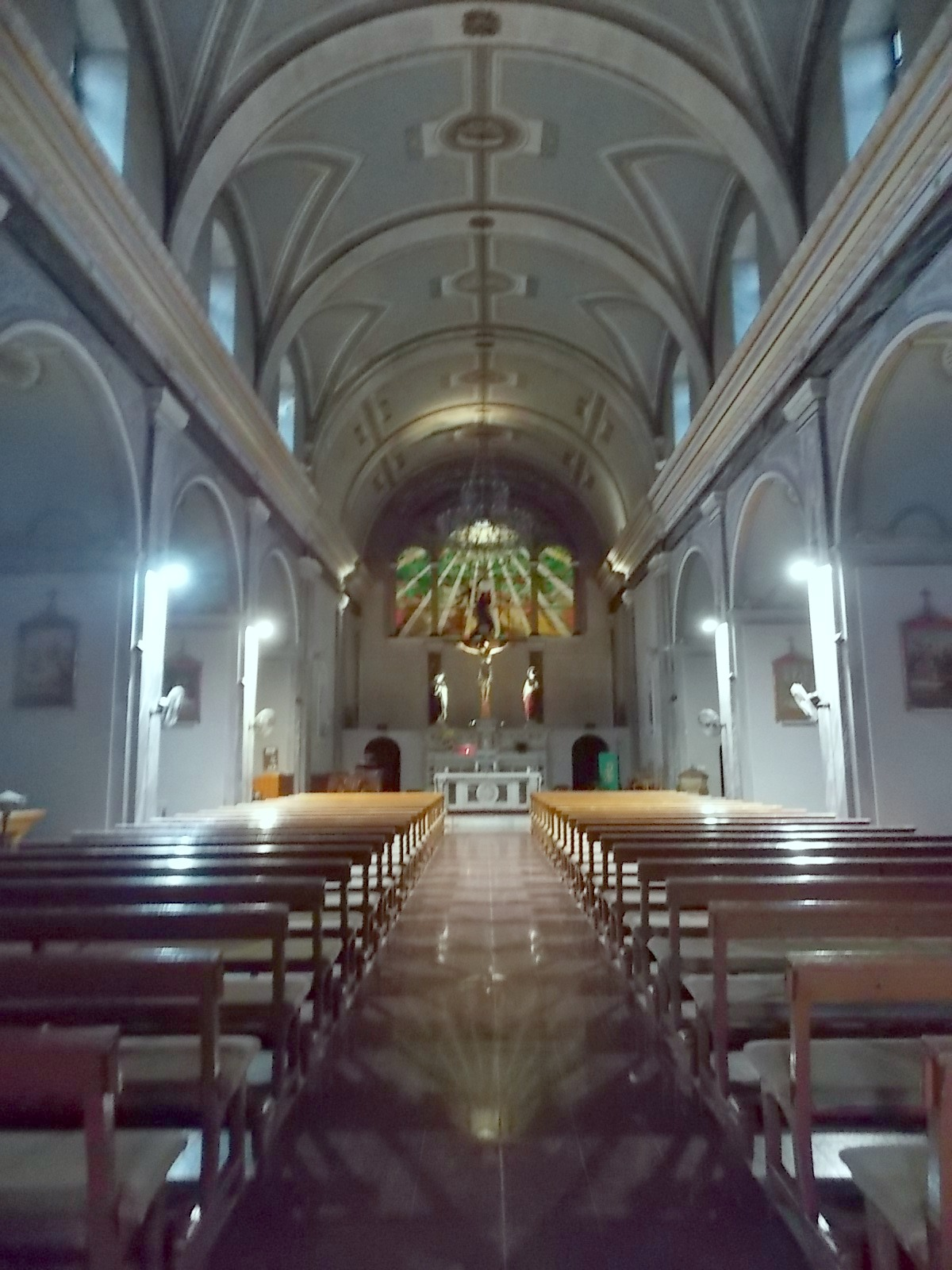
Internal view of the church

== See also ==
- Roman Catholicism in Cyprus
