= Spathariko =

Spathariko: Σπαθαρικό (Greek); Ötüken (Turkish)
- Village
- Location in Cyprus
- Coordinates: 35°14′6″N 33°52′28″E
- Country (de jure): Cyprus
  - District: Famagusta District
- Country (de facto): Northern Cyprus
  - District: İskele District
- Time zone: UTC+2 (EET)
  - Summer (DST): UTC+3 (EEST)

Spathariko (Greek: Σπαθαρικό; Turkish: Ötüken) is a village in the Famagusta District of Cyprus, located north of Famagusta. It is under the de facto control of Northern Cyprus.
