= Artemi =

Artemi: Αρτέμι (Greek); Arıdamı (Turkish)
- Village
- Location in Cyprus
- Coordinates: 35°19′13″N 33°42′13″E
- Country (de jure): Cyprus
  - District: Famagusta District
- Country (de facto): Northern Cyprus
  - District: Gazimağusa District
- Time zone: UTC+2 (EET)
  - Summer (DST): UTC+3 (EEST)

Artemi (Greek: Αρτέμι; Turkish: Arıdamı) is an abandoned village in the Famagusta District of Cyprus, located 9 km north of Lefkoniko on the south side of the Kyrenia mountain range. It is under the de facto control of Northern Cyprus, being a part of the Gazimağusa District.

The population of the village historically consisted entirely of Turkish Cypriots. Following the Turkish invasion of Cyprus in 1974 and the displacement of the Greek Cypriot population of the neighbouring town of Lefkoniko, the villagers abandoned Artemi and moved to Lefkoniko instead.
