= Lefkoniko =

Lefkoniko: Λευκόνοικο (Greek); Geçitkale (Turkish)
- Municipality
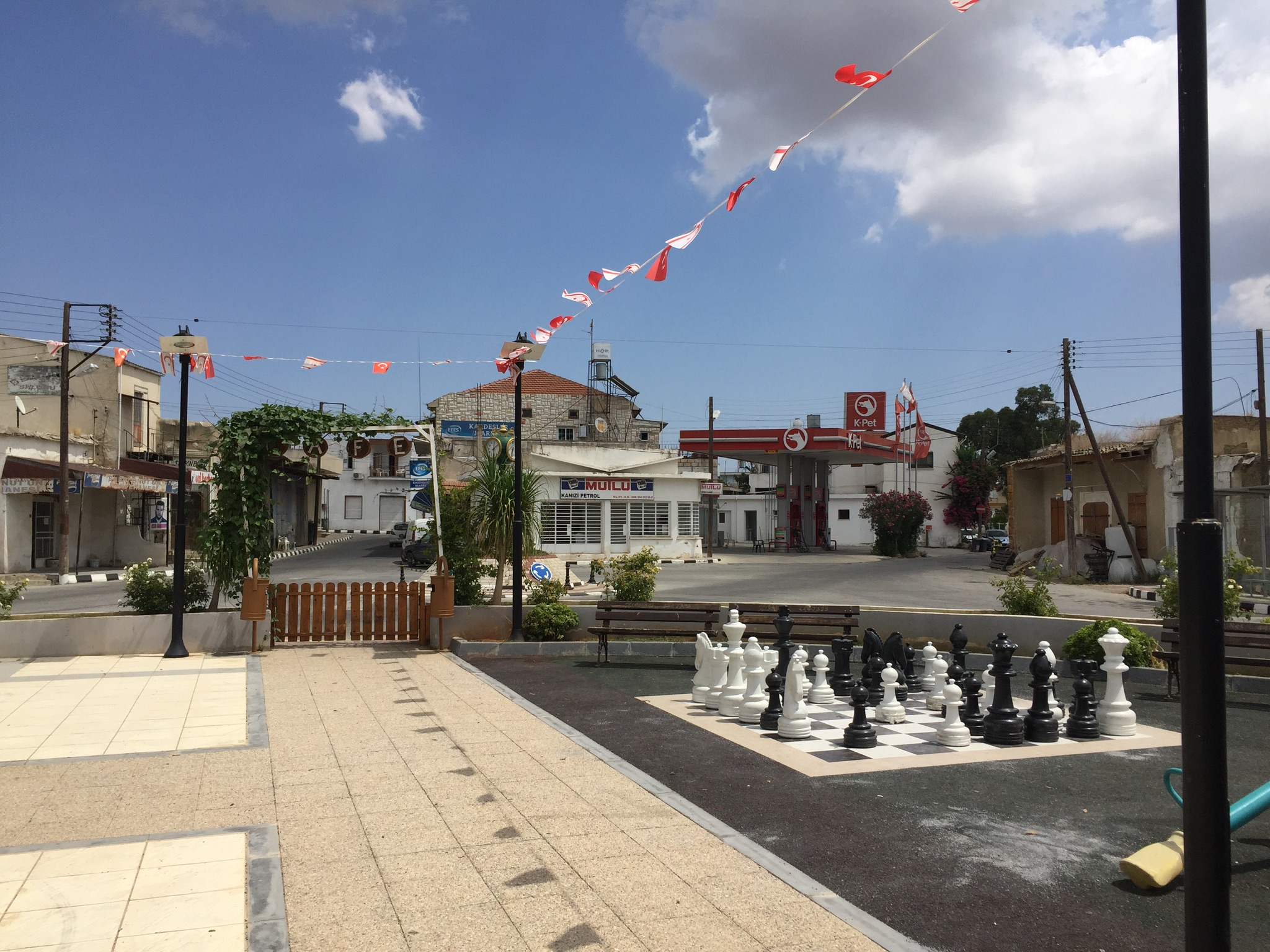
- The main square of the town

- Location within Cyprus
- Coordinates: 35°15′36″N 33°43′54″E
- Country (de jure): Cyprus
  - District: Famagusta District
- Country (de facto): Northern Cyprus
  - District: Gazimağusa District

Government
  - Mayor: Hasan Öztaş (in Lefkoniko); Pieris Gypsiotis (in exile)

Population (2011)
  - Total: 1,253
  - Municipality: 2,380
- Website: Turkish Cypriot municipality Greek Cypriot municipality

Lefkoniko (Greek: Λευκόνοικο; Turkish: Lefkonuk or Geçitkale) is a town in the Mesaoria Plain under the de facto control of Northern Cyprus, claimed by Cyprus. Lefkoniko is the birthplace of Cypriot national poet Vasilis Michaelides and is known for its lace.

Geçitkale Air Base of the Turkish Air Force is near Lefkoniko.

== History ==
In 1909, the first co-op in Cyprus was founded in Lefkoniko and, in 1939, the municipality of Lefkoniko was established.

In a 1955 anti-British demonstration, schoolboys burned the town post office. A collective fine of $2,000 was placed on the inhabitants of Lefkoniko and the Governor of Cyprus ordered a 24-hour curfew on Lefkoniko until it was paid.

== Demographics ==
Before 1960, Lefkoniko was inhabited both by Greek and Turkish Cypriots. The latter were the minority. With the exception of a family of three, all Turkish Cypriots fled the town in the Emergency years. Greek Cypriots were displaced to the south of the island during the 1974 Turkish invasion of Cyprus, and Lefkoniko was repopulated by Turkish Cypriots from Kofinou and nearby Artemi, which was abandoned. In 1960, Lefkoniko had a population of 2,358. It was the 8th most populous settlement in Famagusta District and 32nd in the whole of Cyprus. As of 2011, its population was 1,253.

== Sports ==
Turkish Cypriot Geçitkale Günay Spor Kulübü was founded in 1955, and is now in Cyprus Turkish Football Association (CTFA) BTM 1st League. Also Geçitkale Women's Team was founded in 2012 and currently playing in the top league of CTFA Women's League.

== International relations ==
=== Cittaslow ===
In June 2018, after long efforts, Lefkoniko finally joined to Cittaslow (slow city) network and received their official certificate of conformity and their flag during the general assembly. Therefore, Lefkoniko has won the fourth Cittaslow title in the TRNC.

=== Twin towns – sister cities ===
Lefkoniko is twinned with:

- Yalova, Turkey

== Tourist attractions ==
=== Archangelos Michael Church ===
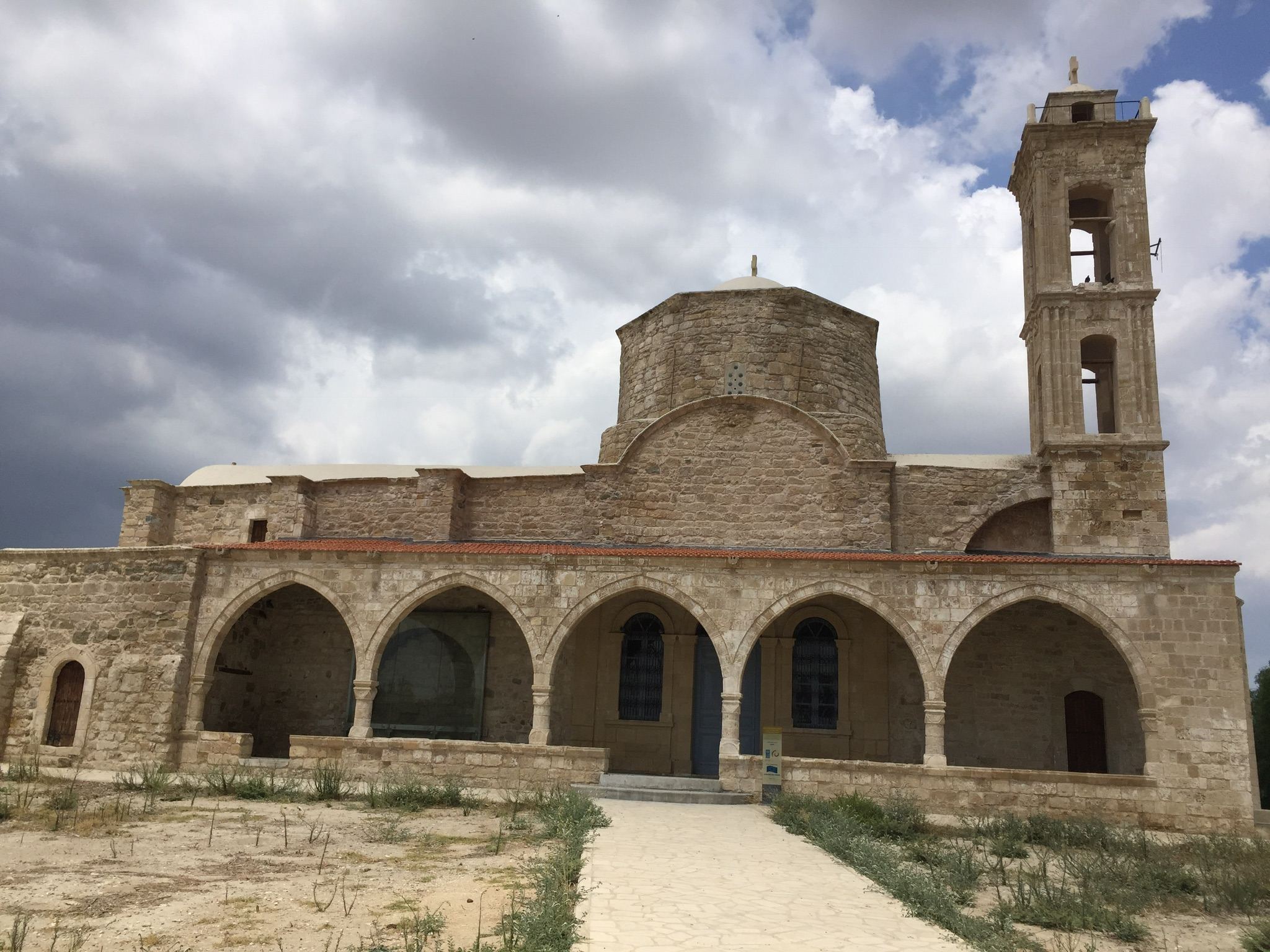
Archangelos Michael Church in 2019, following restoration works.

The construction of the church dates back to the 12th century. The church has an arcade along the south side and a double aisle with a chamber at the south west corner of it. The church also has a painting of Archangelos Michael covering a wall. Renovation works are fully funded by EU within Cultural Heritage Programme that European Commission implements through UNDP. Renovation works have started in October 2016 and completed in a year (October 2017). The total cost was 430,000 Euro.
