= Catholic Church in Cyprus =

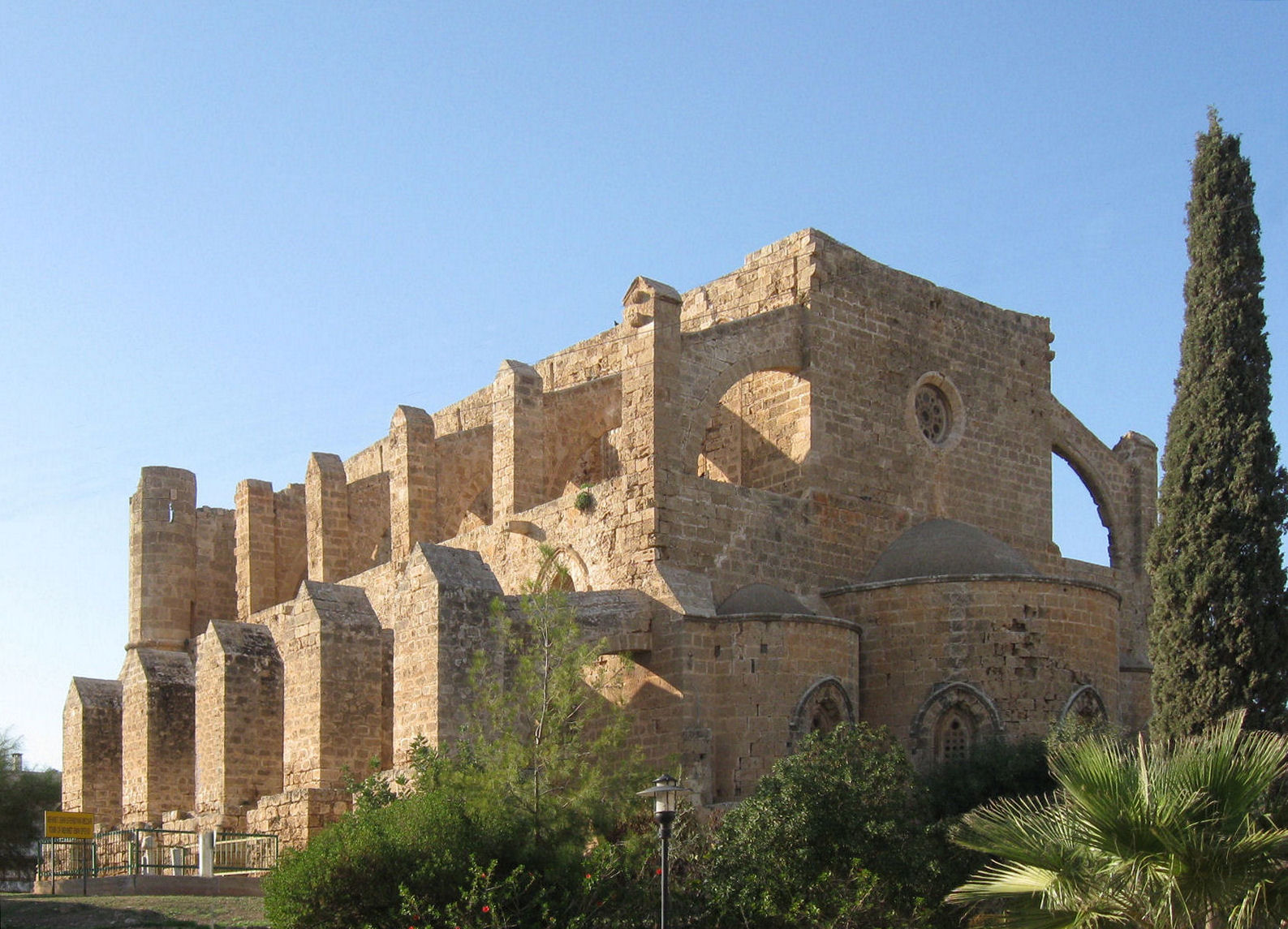
Gothic-style church in Famagusta (1360)

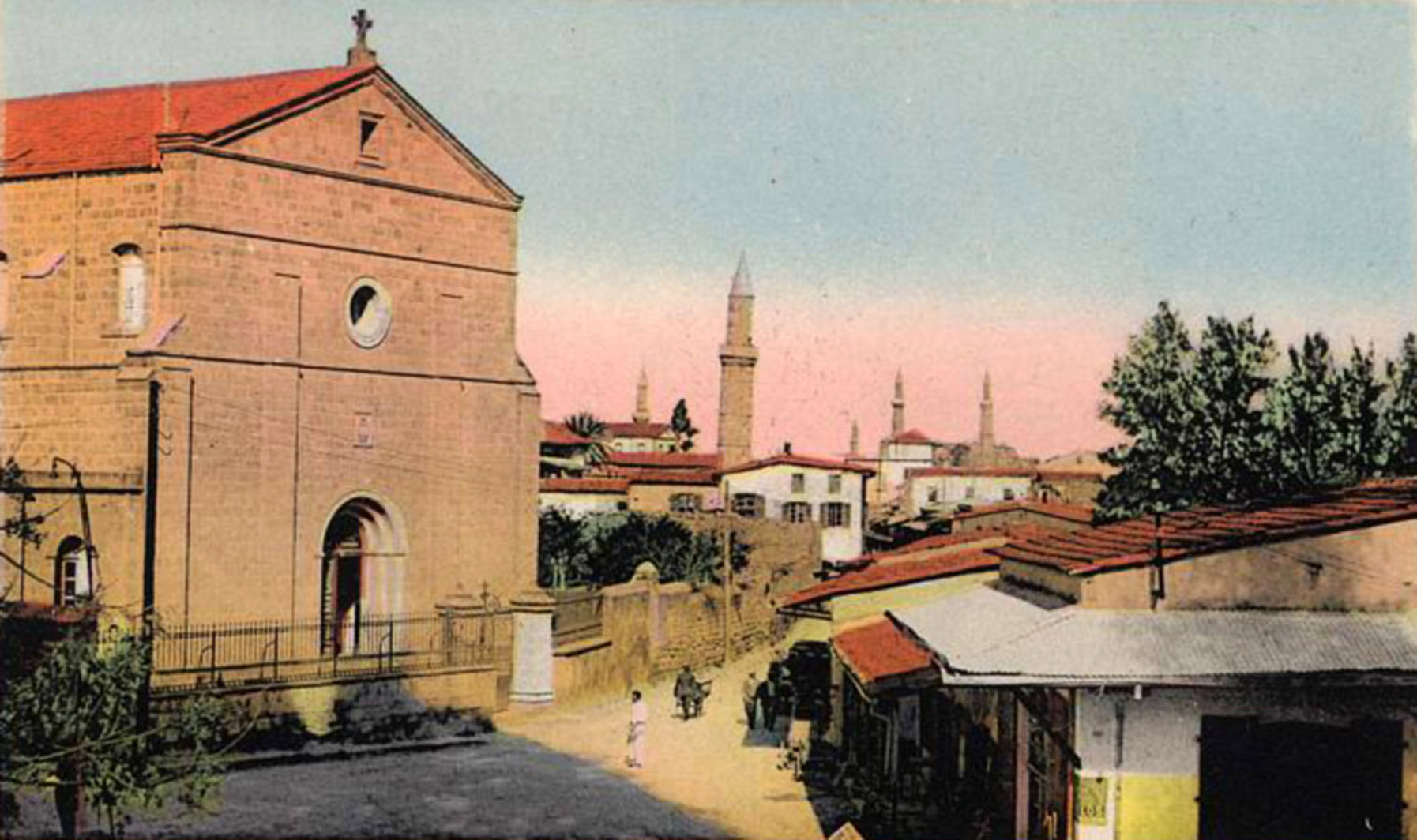
The Holy Cross Cathedral in Nicosia in the early 20th century

The Catholic Church in Cyprus is part of the worldwide Catholic Church, under the spiritual leadership of the Pope in Rome.

== Description ==
There are around 10,000 Catholic faithful in Cyprus, corresponding to just over 1% of the total population. Most Catholic worshippers are either Maronite Cypriots, under the pastoral care of Joseph Soueif, Archeparch of the Maronite Catholic Archeparchy of Cyprus, or Latins, under the pastoral care of the Latin Patriarch of Jerusalem, with a Patriarchal Vicar General. The Maronite Catholic community and the Roman Catholic community of Cyprus (Latinoi, Λατίνοι) are two of the three recognised religious minorities of Cyprus, together with the Armenians, according to the 1960 constitution, and are represented in the Cypriot parliament.

The Maronite Archbishopric has 12 parishes in Cyprus:

- Parish of Our Lady of Grace in Nicosia
- Parish of Saint George in Kormakitis
- Parish of Saint Michael the Archangel in Αsomatos
- Parish of Saint Croix in Karpasha
- Parish of Saint Marina in Saint Marina
- Parish of Saint-Maron at Anthoupolis
- Parish of Saint-Marina of Kotsiatis
- Parish of Saint-Charbel in Limassol
- Parish of Saint Marina in Polemidia
- Parish of Saint Joseph in Larnaca
- Parish of Saint Kyriaki in Pafos

The Latin Patriarchal Vicariate for Cyprus has four parishes:

- The Holy Cross church in Nicosia, with a dependent mission at the St. Elizabeth Catholic Church in Kyrenia, Northern Cyprus.
- The St. Mary of Graces Church in Larnaca.
- The St. Catherine Catholic Church in Limassol.
- The St. Paul Catholic Church in Paphos.

The Sisters of St. Bruno and Bethlehem have a small convent at Mesa Chorio served by the parish priest of Paphos. A recently constructed hospice provides palliative care, regardless of nationality or religious persuasion.

There is also a Catholic presence through chapels and chaplains serving British military personnel, staff and dependents in the Sovereign Base Areas of the island that were established in 1960.

On March 16, 2024, in Nicosia, Cardinal Pierbattista Pizzaballa consecrated Msgr. Bruno Varriano, OFM, as Bishop, the first Catholic bishop in Cyprus in 340 years.

== Sacred sites in Cyprus ==
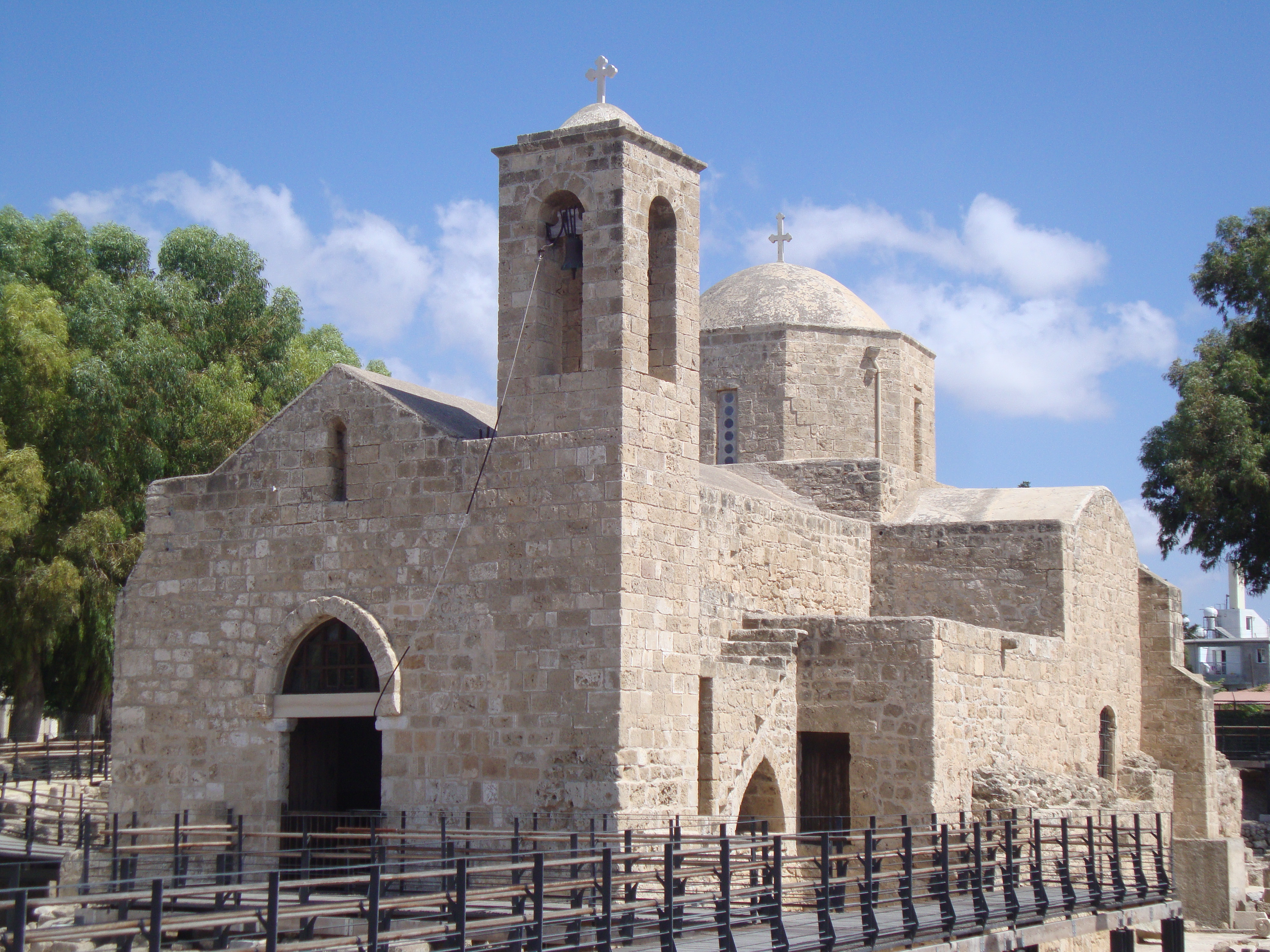
The Catholic Chrysopolitissa Church, Paphos

Many of the religious sites in Cyprus can be traced to early Byzantine foundations, built before the East-West Schism between Rome and Constantinople in the 11th century. Their architecture and iconography reveal a profound influence on ecclesial building traditions still in use in the Cypriot Orthodox Church. In the Middle Ages, Cyprus was ruled by a Frankish aristocracy, the Lusignan dynasty. They favoured the Gothic style when establishing cathedrals and monasteries. The former Catholic Augustinian Cloister of Bellapais near Kyrenia was transferred to Orthodox Church authorities when the Ottomans conquered Cyprus at the end of the 16th century. Other Gothic churches were converted to mosques, for example Saint Sophia Cathedral, now Selimiye Mosque (Nicosia), and Saint Nicholas Cathedral in Famagusta, now the Lala Mustafa Pasha Mosque.

== See also ==
- Religion in Cyprus
- Christianity in Cyprus
- Catholic Church in Greece
