= Pano Deftera =

Pano Deftera: Πάνω Δευτερά (Greek); Yukarı Deftera (Turkish)
- Location within Cyprus
- Coordinates: 35°04′50″N 33°15′58″E
- Country: Cyprus
- District: Nicosia District

Population (2021)
  - Total: 3,007
- Website: www.deftera.org

Pano Deftera (Greek: Πάνω Δευτερά; Turkish: Yukarı Deftera) is a village 11 km south-west of Nicosia in Cyprus. Pano Deftera was the home of the well-known Eramian family, an Armenian-Cypriot family that came to Cyprus in 1768 and its descendants are spread around the world. The history of the family is documented in Joy Kouyoumdjian's book The Agha's Children.
