= Kornokipos =

Kornokipos: Κορνόκηπος (Greek); Görneç (Turkish)
- Location in Cyprus
- Coordinates: 35°16′57″N 33°34′22″E
- Country (de jure): Cyprus
  - District: Famagusta District
- Country (de facto): Northern Cyprus
  - District: Gazimağusa District

Population
  - Total: 500
- Time zone: UTC+2 (EET)
  - Summer (DST): UTC+3 (EEST)

Kornokipos (Greek: Κορνόκηπος; Turkish: Görneç) is a village in the Famagusta District in Cyprus, located on the south eastern side of the Kyrenia Mountains. It is under the de facto control of Northern Cyprus.

The village name is thought to mean "Beautiful Garden" in ancient Greek. It is since the Ottoman times in Cyprus an exclusively Turkish Cypriot village and remains so today. In 1960, it had a population of 292 and in 1973 a population of 315. It currently has a population of around 500.

The village was held temporarily by Greek Cypriot soldiers in 1974 after the Turkish army's invasion on the 20th of July 1974.

== Sports ==
Turkish Cypriot Görneç Sports Club was founded in 1982; as of 2015, it competes in Cyprus Turkish Football Association (CTFA) K-PET 1st League.

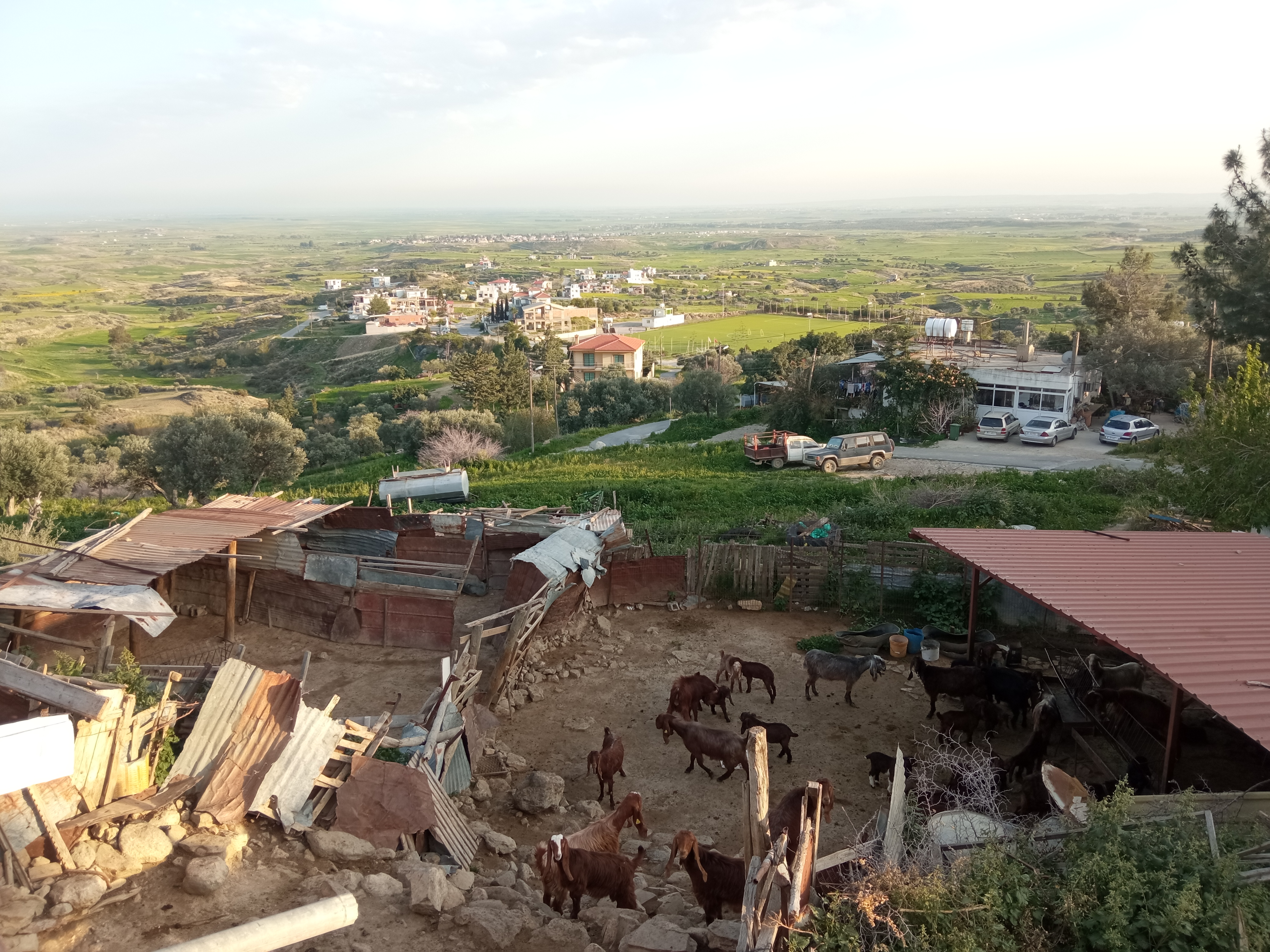
Görneç
