= Notre Dame de Tyre =

Coordinates: 35.175000°N 33.358267°E

- Benedictine Abbey of Our Lady of Tyre
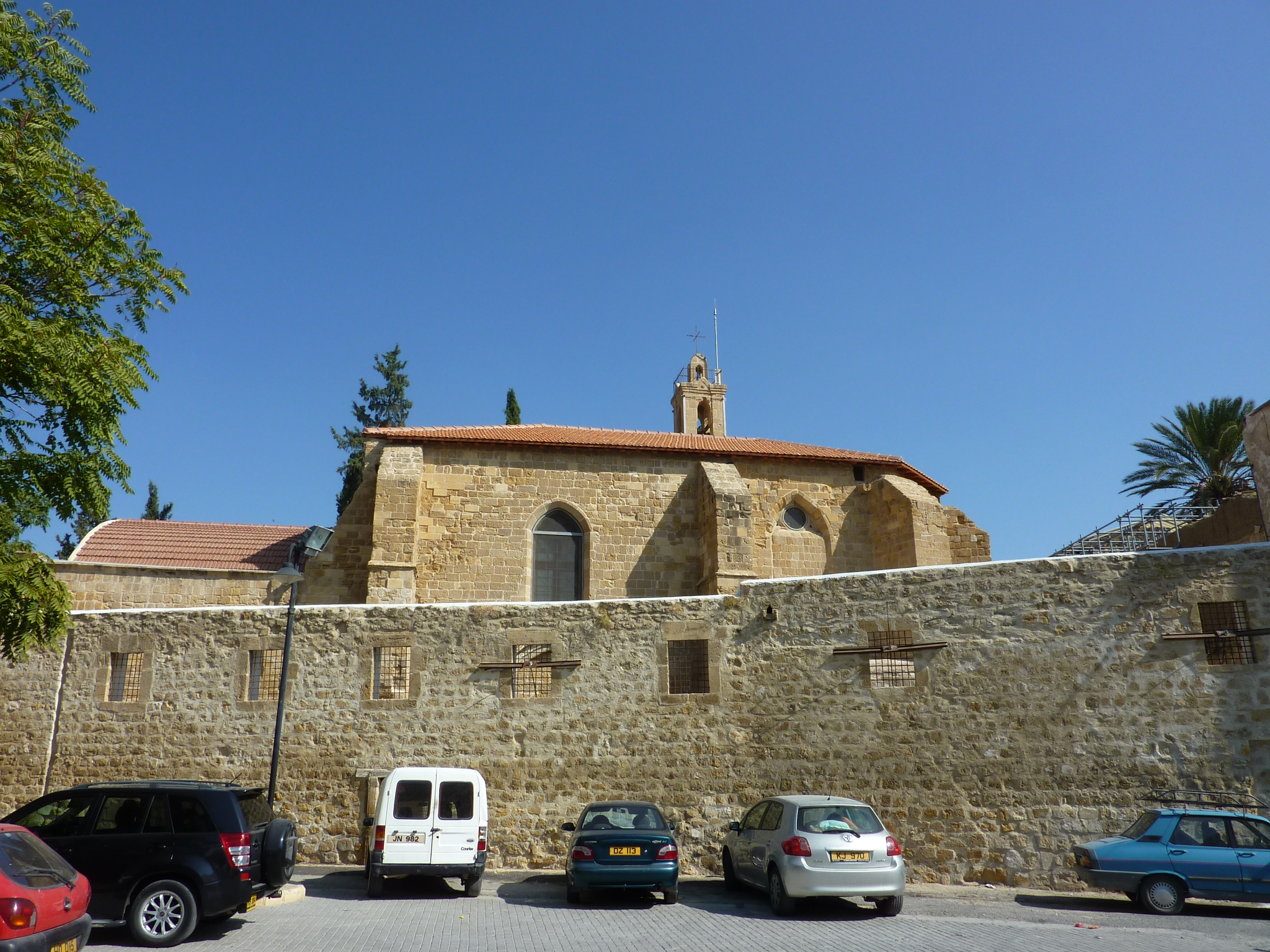
- Notre Dame de Tyre in 2014
- Notre Dame de Tyre
- Location: Arab Ahmet, Nicosia
- Country: de jure Cyprus de facto Northern Cyprus
- Denomination: Armenian Apostolic
- Previous denomination: Benedictine

History
- Founded: 13th century

Architecture
- Style: Gothic

Notre Dame de Tyre or Our Lady of Tyre (Armenian: Սուրբ Աստուածածին եկեղեցի), or simply the Armenian church (Turkish: Meryam Ana Ermeni Kilisesi) is located in Nicosia, Cyprus, in the Arab Ahmet Pasha quarter, on Salahi Şevket Street.

== History ==
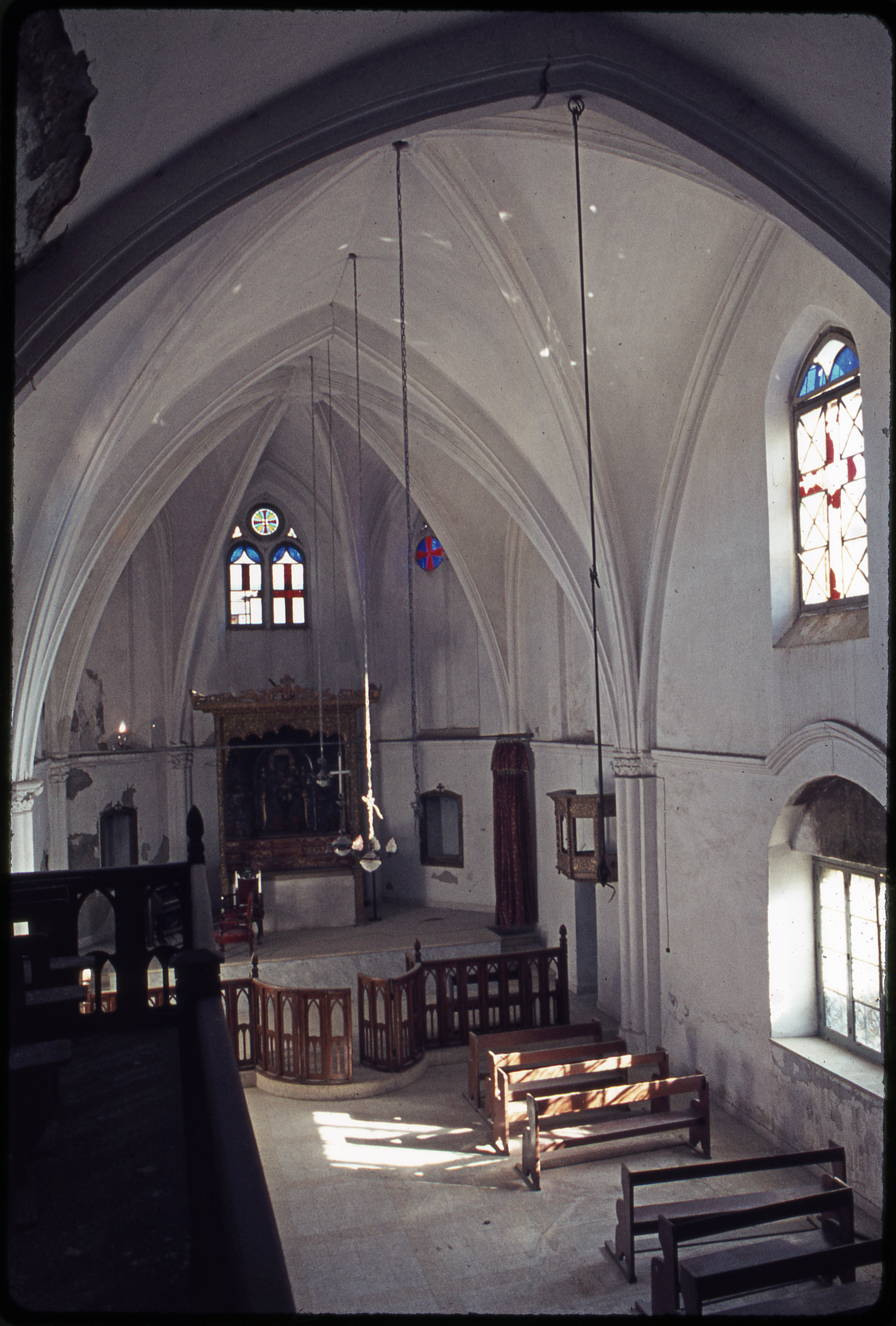
The interior of Notre Dame de Tyre, as it was in 1974

It was originally built in 1116 by the King of Jerusalem Baldwin de Buillon. After the Siege of Jerusalem in 1187, it was used to house the administration of various religious orders. A few years after the start of the Frankish Era (1192), it became an abbey for the Carthusian nuns. Following the Siege of Antioch (1268) and the Siege of Antioch (1268) and the Fall of Acre (1291), Benedictine nuns settled here, who initially shared the nunnery with the Carthusians.

It was destroyed by the strong earthquake in 1303, and was re-built between 1308 and 1310 by King Henry II. As many of the nuns were Armenian in origin, it came under the Armenian Church between 1491 and 1504.

In 1570, following the conquest of Nicosia by the Ottomans, the church and the keeping of the Paphos Gate were granted to the Armenians by Sultan Selim II.

It was restored in 1688, 1884, 1904 and 1930, the baptistery was built in 1788, the buttresses supporting the northern porch were erected in 1858, the belfry was erected in 1860 (one of the first in Ottoman Cyprus) and the choir gallery was constructed in 1945. In 1950 the belfry was repaired, while in 1961 a new floor was installed, as in 1960 and 1961 the Antiquities Department removed the mediaeval tombstones that were covered by carpets. The cathedral was listed as an ancient monument on 18 December 1936.

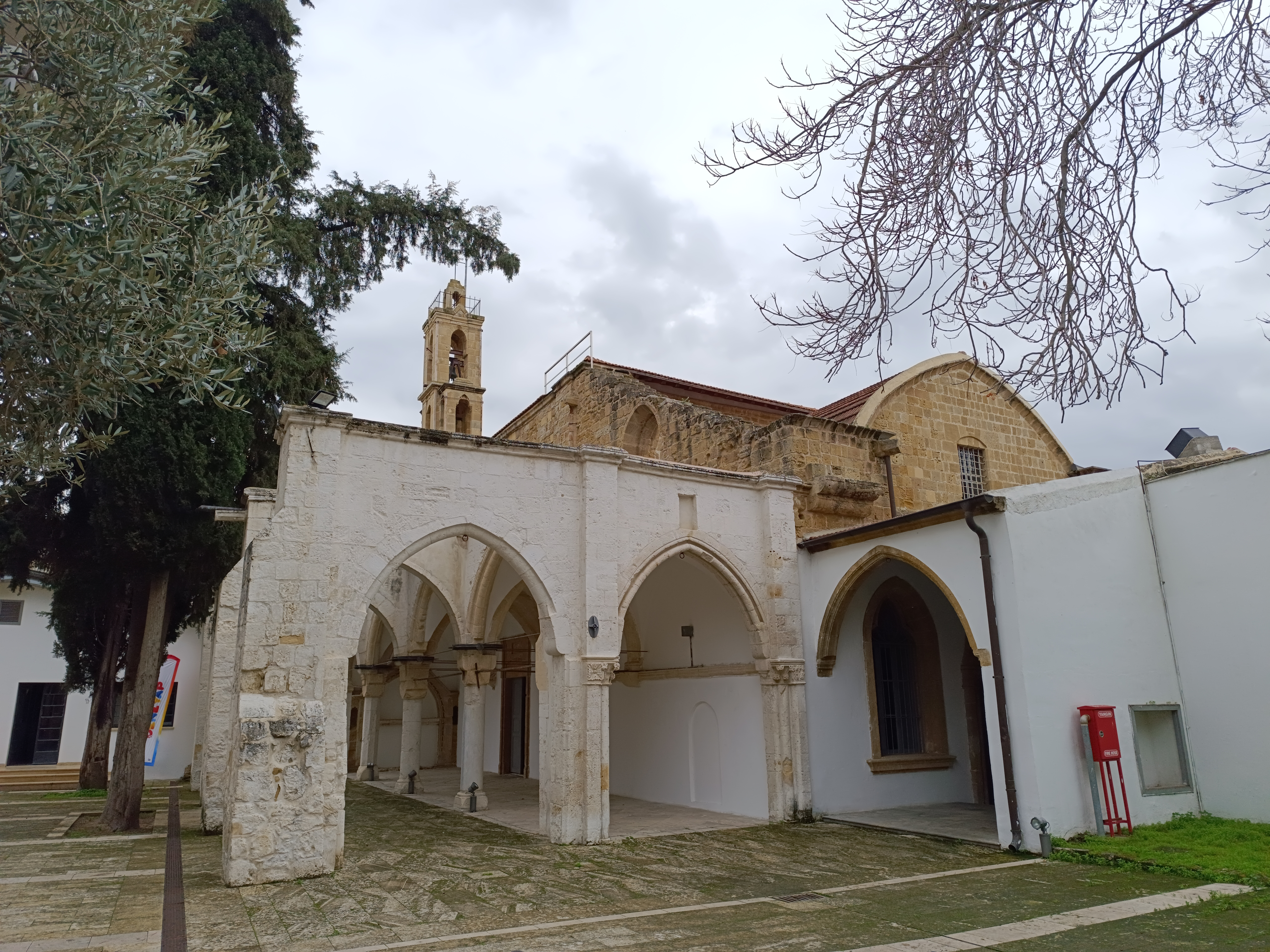
External view of the church

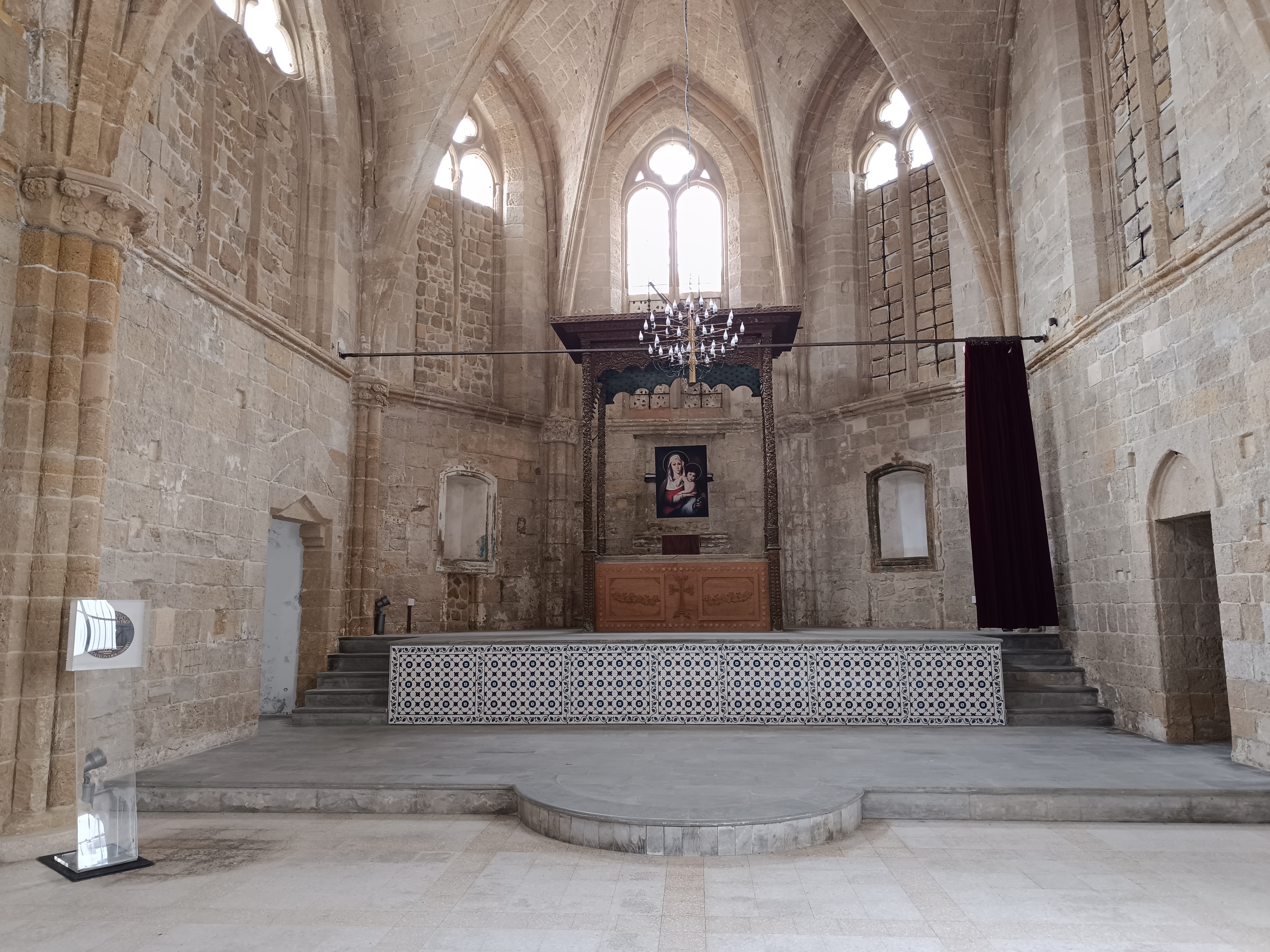
The interior of the church

Nicosia's Armenian Quarter was taken over by the Turkish Resistance Organisation during the 1963–1964 inter-communal troubles. Between 1964 and 1974, the compound was used by the Turkish-Cypriot militia, whereas after the 1974 Turkish invasion it was used as barracks for Turkish soldiers. After the 1998 earthquake, the army left and Anatolian settlers moved in, until 2007.

== Architecture and sepulchral monuments ==
The existing building is gothic in style and consists of a square nave, with a semi-octagonal apse, cross vaults an arch covering the western part, a bell tower (built in 1860) and convent buildings to the north of the church. To the east of the nunnery buildings is the sarcophagus of Lady Dampierre, an Abbess of the nunnery. A number of tomb slabs in the floor of the church dating from the 14th and 15th centuries were noted in the nineteenth and early twentieth centuries, but these were lifted in the 1960s as a conservation measure and kept in the north porch.

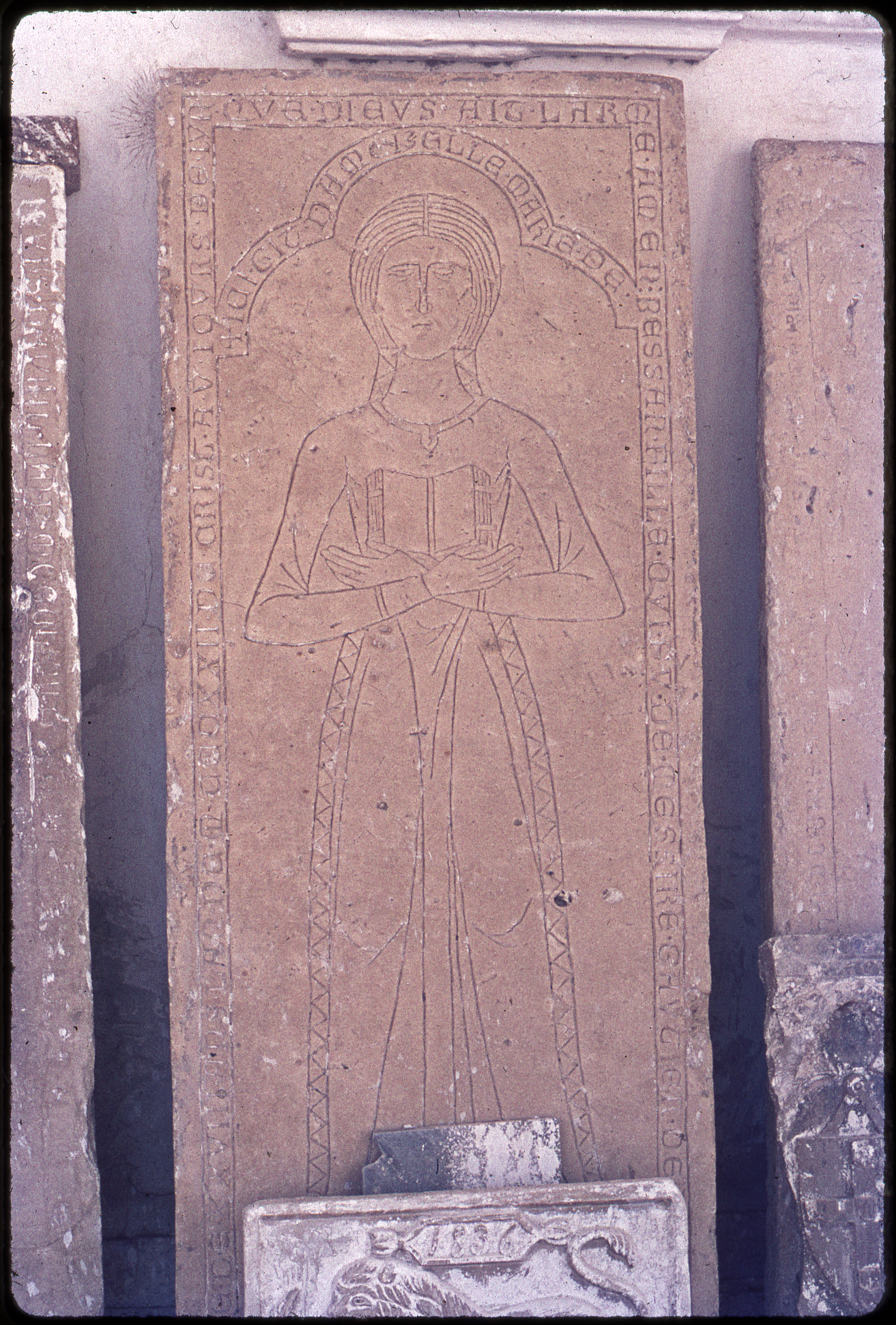
Mediaeval tombstone outside Notre Dame de Tyre, 1974

== Restoration ==
The church was reportedly damaged following its placement in the Turkish Cypriot part of the city following the 1963 division and the 1974 Turkish invasion of Cyprus. After 1963, it suffered from neglect and misuse, which put it in dire need of repair as some parts collapsed. In 2007, the UNDP began working on its preservation and restoration. The renovation was completed in 2013 and won the EU Prize For Cultural Heritage (Europa Nostra Award) in 2015.

== See also ==
- Armenians in Cyprus
- Armenian Prelature of Cyprus
