= Vakram =

Byzantine governor of Cyprus in 965

Vakram was the Byzantine governor of Cyprus in 965. He was of Armenian origin.

== Sources ==
- Sanjian, Avedis K., The Armenian Communities in Syria under Ottoman Dominion (Cambridge, Massachusetts: Harvard University Press, 1965) p. 161
