= 2018 Moscow–Constantinople schism =

Split between the patriarchates of Constantinople and Moscow

| Emblem of Ecumenical Patriarch Bartholomew I of Constantinople | Monogram of Patriarch Kirill of Moscow |
Emblems of both primates of their respective Churches (Ecumenical Patriarchate, Russian Orthodox Church) when the schism happened
- Date: 15 October 2018 – present
- Also known as: Orthodox schism; Orthodox Church schism
- Type: Christian schism
- Participants: Primary: Ecumenical Patriarchate; Russian Orthodox Church; Secondary: UOC-KP (Note: Both united to form the OCU on 15 December 2018. Part of the UOC-KP left the OCU on 20 June 2019.); UAOC; OCU; UOC-MP (Note: Left the ROC on 27 May 2022); LOC (Note: Left the ROC on 8 September 2022); EOC (Note: Left the ROC on 20 August 2024)
- Outcome: The severing of full communion with the Ecumenical Patriarchate by the Russian Orthodox Church (and ROCOR).; Creation of the autocephalous Orthodox Church of Ukraine by the Ecumenical Patriarchate.; Creation of the PEWE, the PESEA, and the PEA by the Russian Orthodox Church.; Recognition of the OCU's autocephaly by the Church of Greece, the Greek Orthodox Patriarchate of Alexandria, and the Church of Cyprus.; Severing of communion with Ecumenical Patriarch Bartholomew I of Constantinople, Archbishop Ieronymos II of Athens, Patriarch Theodore II of Alexandria, and Archbishop Chrysostomos II of Cyprus by the Russian Orthodox Church.; The UOC-MP cut ties with the Russian Orthodox Church over handling, perceived betrayal, and consequences of the Russian invasion of Ukraine. A similar outcome happens with the LOC several months later.; Creation of the EEPL by the Ecumenical Patriarchate.; The parliaments of Ukraine, Latvia and Estonia pass laws which ban direct churches of having ties to the Russian Orthodox Church.

The 2018 Moscow–Constantinople schism is an ongoing schism between the Russian Orthodox Church (ROC, also known as the Moscow Patriarchate) and the Ecumenical Patriarchate of Constantinople, which began on 15 October 2018 when the former unilaterally severed full communion with the latter.

The resolution was taken in response to a decision of the Holy Synod of the Ecumenical Patriarchate of Constantinople of 11 October 2018, confirming its intentions to grant autocephaly to the Orthodox Church of Ukraine in the future. The decision also stated that the Holy Synod would immediately: reestablish a stauropegion in Kiev, i.e. a church body subordinated directly to the ecumenical patriarch; revoke the "Letter of issue" (permission) of 1686 (Note: This letter led to the Russian Orthodox Church establishing de facto its jurisdiction over the Ukrainian Orthodox church. It can be found here: "Patriarchal Letter to the Kings of Russia", "The Ecumenical Throne and the Church of Ukraine – The Documents Speak" (September 2018), pp. 35–39 (English translation based on the text published in: Собрание государственных грамот и договоров, хранящихся в государственной коллегии иностранных дел [Collection of state documents and treaties kept in the Collegium of Foreign Affairs], Part Four, Moscow, 1826, 514–517).) that had given permission to the patriarch of Moscow to ordain the metropolitan of Kiev and lift the excommunications which affected the clergy and faithfuls of two unrecognized Ukrainian Eastern Orthodox churches. Those two unrecognized churches, the Ukrainian Autocephalous Orthodox Church (UAOC) and the Ukrainian Orthodox Church – Kiev Patriarchate (UOC-KP), were competing with the Ukrainian Orthodox Church (Moscow Patriarchate) (UOC-MP) and were considered schismatics by the Patriarchate of Moscow, as well as by the other Eastern Orthodox churches.

In its decision of 15 October 2018, the Holy Synod of the Russian Orthodox Church barred all members of the Moscow Patriarchate (both clergy and laity) from taking part in communion, baptism, and marriage at any church controlled by the Ecumenical Patriarchate. Before that, in response to the appointment of two exarchs of the Ecumenical Patriarchate in Ukraine, the Holy Synod of the Moscow Patriarchate had decided, on 14 September 2018, to break off participation in any episcopal assemblies, theological discussions, multilateral commissions, and any other structures that are chaired or co-chaired by representatives of the Ecumenical Patriarchate.

The schism forms part of a wider political conflict surrounding the Russo-Ukrainian war. This schism is reminiscent of the Moscow–Constantinople schism of 1996 over canonical jurisdiction over Estonia, which was, however, resolved after less than three months.

On 21 October 2019, Archbishop Ieronymos II of Athens, the primate of the Church of Greece, sent a peaceful letter to Epiphanius, the primate of the Orthodox Church of Ukraine (OCU, that was formed by the unification of the UOC-KP, UAOC, and parts of the UOC-MP on 15 December 2018). This decision was supported by the whole hierarchy (bishops) of the Church of Greece, minus seven metropolitans. This decision meant that the Church of Greece recognized the OCU. The ROC had announced previously it would break communion with any hierarch of the Church of Greece who enters in communion with any hierarch of the OCU. On Sunday, 3 November 2019, Patriarch Kirill of Moscow did not mention the primate of the Church of Greece in the liturgy, removing him from the diptych. On 26 December, the ROC broke eucharistic communion with the Greek Orthodox patriarch of Alexandria, Theodore II, and ceased commemorating him, because he had recognized the OCU the month before. On 20 November 2020, the Holy Synod of the ROC declared that Patriarch Kirill can no longer commemorate Archbishop Chrysostomos II of Cyprus as a result of Chrysostomos' commemoration of Epiphanius on 24 October 2020.

On 22 November 2022, Theodore II of Alexandria stopped the commemoration of Patriarch Kirill of Moscow.

== Background ==
=== History of the sees of Kiev and Moscow ===
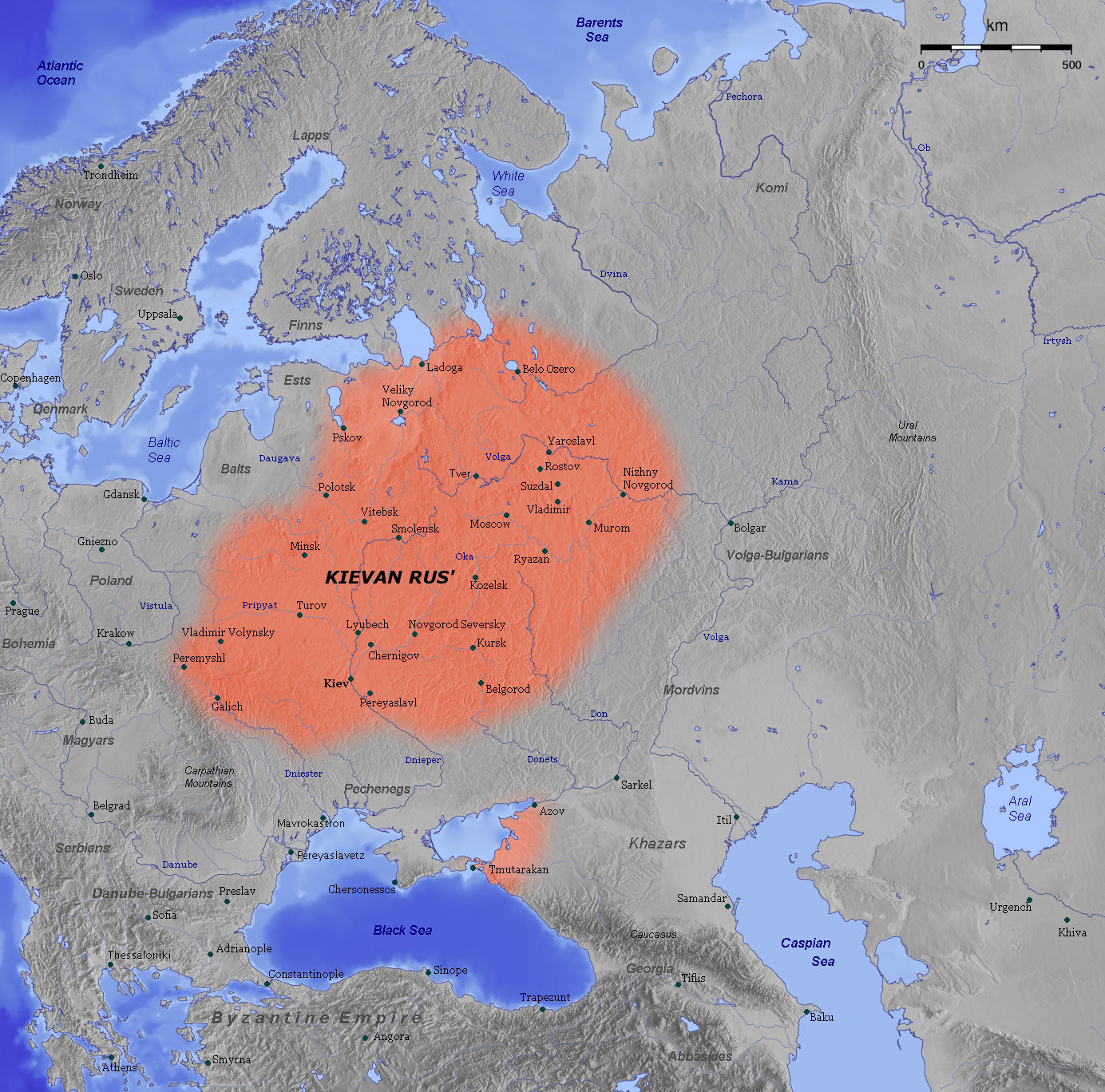
Kievan Rus' in the 11th century

After the Christianization of Kievan Rus' (Note: Rus' is a region inhabited by East Slavs who were once ruled by princes from the Rurik dynasty. This term refers to the Middle Ages, in contrast to the more recent (15th century) term "Russia". See also: Names of Rus', Russia and Ruthenia.) these lands were under the control of the metropolitan of Kiev. Among the 24 metropolitans who held the throne before the Mongol invasion, only two were of local origin and the rest were Greek. Usually, they were appointed by Constantinople and were not chosen by the bishops of their dioceses, as it should be done according to the canon. After the Mongol invasion, the southern part of Rus' was heavily devastated and the disintegration of Kievan Rus' accelerated. Metropolitan Kirill II, who occupied the throne for 30 years, spent almost all of his time in the lands of Vladimir-Suzdal Rus' and visited Kiev only twice, although earlier he had come from Galicia and had been nominated for the post of metropolitan by Prince Daniel of Galicia. After the new Mongol raid in 1299, Metropolitan Maksim finally moved to Vladimir in the north, and did not even leave a bishop behind. In 1303 a new cathedral was created for south-west Rus' in Galicia and the new Metropolitan was consecrated by Constantinople, but its existence ended in 1355 after the Galicia–Volhynia Wars. In 1325, Metropolitan Peter moved to Moscow, thus greatly contributing to the rise of the Grand Duchy of Moscow, which gradually conquered other Russian principalities in the northeast of the former Kievan Rus'. Another part of Kievan Rus' gradually came under the rule of the Grand Duchy of Lithuania and the Kingdom of Poland, which entered into rivalry with Moscow. In particular, the Grand Dukes of Lithuania sought from Constantinople a separate metropolitan for the Orthodox who lived in their lands. Although the metropolitan in Moscow continued to retain the title of "metropolitan of Kiev and All Rus'", he could not rule the Orthodox outside the borders of the Grand Duchy of Moscow. Constantinople twice agreed to create a separate metropolitan for Lithuania, but these decisions were not permanent, Constantinople being inclined to maintain a single church government on the lands of the former Kievan Rus'.

In 1439, Constantinople entered into union with the Rome. In Moscow, this decision was rejected outright, and Metropolitan Isidor, consecrated by Constantinople, was accused of heresy, imprisoned, and later expelled. In 1448, the council of north-eastern Russian clergy in Moscow, at the behest of Prince Vasily II of Moscow, elected Jonah the metropolitan of Kiev and all Rus' without the consent of the patriarch of Constantinople. In 1469 Patriarch Dionysius I stated that Constantinople would not recognize any metropolitan ordained without its blessing. Meanwhile, the metropolis of Kiev (de facto in Novogrudok) stayed under the jurisdiction of the Ecumenical Patriarch of Constantinople. Moscow's de facto independence from Constantinople remained unrecognized until 1589 when Patriarch Jeremias II of Constantinople approved the creation of a new, fifth Orthodox Patriarchate in Moscow. This decision was finally confirmed by the four older patriarchs in 1593.

The Patriarch of Moscow became the head of "all Russia and Northern countries", (Note: In Russian: Патриарх Московский и всея России и северных стран) and Chernigov (now in Ukraine) was one of his dioceses. However, he had no power among the Orthodox bishops of the Polish–Lithuanian Commonwealth, who remained under the rule of Constantinople. At the same time, the Orthodox hierarchs of those lands were inclined to the Union with Rome, despite the resistance of their parishes, who formed the Orthodox brotherhoods (or fraternities) to keep their identity. On the way from Moscow, Jeremiah II visited the lands of present-day Ukraine and committed an unprecedented act, granting Stauropegia (direct subordination to the Patriarch) to many Orthodox brotherhoods. This provoked the anger of the local bishops and soon the Union of Brest was proclaimed, which was supported by the majority of the Orthodox bishops of the Commonwealth, including Metropolitan Michail Rogoza. Officially, the Orthodox (but not the Eastern Catholic) Metropolis of Kiev in the Polish-Lithuanian Commonwealth was eliminated and re-established only in 1620, in subsequent co-existence with Uniate Metropolis. That led to sharp conflict and numerous revolts culminating in the Khmelnytsky uprising.

In 1654, Russia entered the war with the Polish-Lithuanian Commonwealth; it quickly occupied, for a while, the lands of present Belarus, and gained some power over the Hetmanate pursuant to the Pereyaslav Agreement (1654). The official title of Patriarch Nikon of Moscow was "Patriarch of Moscow and all Greater, Lesser, and White Russia". However, the Metropolitan of Kiev Sylvester Kosiv had managed to defend his independence from the Moscow Patriarchate. The Moscow government, which needed the support of the Orthodox clergy, postponed the resolution of this issue.

In 1686, Ecumenical Patriarch Dionysius IV approved the new metropolitan of Kiev, Gedeon Chetvertinsky, who would be ordained by the Moscow Patriarchate and thus transferred, albeit with certain qualifications, a part of the Kiev ecclesiastical province to the jurisdiction of Patriarchate of Moscow (the Russian Orthodox Church).

In the 1924 Tomos (decree) of the Ecumenical Patriarchate, which granted independence to the Polish Orthodox Church, the previous transfer of the Kievan Church to the jurisdiction of Moscow (in 1685–1686) was declared uncanonical. In addition, the decree pointed out that the conditions of the synodal "Act" of 1686 – which specified that the Russian Orthodox Church was only to consecrate the metropolitan of Kiev – were never adhered to by the Patriarchate of Moscow.

=== Post-Cold War, claims of the Ecumenical Patriarchate and Russkiy mir ===
The historical rivalry between the Ecumenical Patriarchate and the Russian Orthodox Church intensified after the Cold War. Indeed, after the Cold War, Moscow and Constantinople both emerged as "two centers of Orthodox power".

==== Claims of the Ecumenical Patriarchate ====
The Patriarchate of Constantinople claims that: (Note: See also this article on the OrthodoxWiki.)

# The [Ecumenical] Patriarch had the right to establish a court of final appeal for any case from anywhere in the Orthodox world.

1. The [Ecumenical] Patriarch had the exclusive right to summon the other Patriarchs and heads of Autocephalous Churches to a joint meeting of all of them.
2. The [Ecumenical] Patriarch has jurisdiction, ecclesiastical authority over Orthodox Christians who are outside the territory of the local Orthodox Churches, the so-called diaspora.
3. No new "Autocephalous" Church can come into being without the consent of the Patriarch of Constantinople; this consent should express the consensus of the local Orthodox Churches.

==== Russkiy mir ====
Russkiy mir (literally "Russian world") is an ideology promoted by many in the leadership of the Russian Orthodox Church. "This ideology, concocted as a reaction to the loss of Russian control over Ukraine and Belarus after the fall of the Soviet Union, seeks to assert a spiritual and cultural unity of the peoples descended from the Kievan Rus, presumably under Russian leadership." Patriarch Kiril of Moscow also shares this ideology; for the Russian Orthodox Church, the russkiy mir is also "a spiritual concept, a reminder that through the baptism of Rus, God consecrated these people to the task of building a Holy Rus."

On 31 January 2019, Patriarch Kirill of Moscow declared concerning the religious relationship between the Russian Orthodox Church and Ukraine: "Ukraine is not on the periphery of our church. We call Kiev 'the mother of Russian cities'. For us Kiev is what Jerusalem is for many. Russian Orthodoxy began there, so under no circumstances can we abandon this historical and spiritual relationship. The whole unity of our Local Church is based on these spiritual ties."

This ideology was condemned as heretical by the Patriarchate of Alexandria on 23 November 2022.

=== 1996 schism over Estonia ===
The Moscow–Constantinople schism of 1996 began on 23 February 1996, when the Russian Orthodox Church severed full communion with the Ecumenical Patriarchate of Constantinople, and ended on 16 May 1996 when the Russian Orthodox Church and the Ecumenical Patriarchate reached an agreement establishing parallel jurisdictions. The excommunication was in response to the Ecumenical Patriarchate's decision on 20 February 1996 to reestablish an autonomous Orthodox church in Estonia under the Ecumenical Patriarchate's jurisdiction.

The 1996 schism has similarities with the schism of October 2018: both schisms were caused by a dispute between the Russian Orthodox Church and the Ecumenical Patriarchate concerning the canonical jurisdiction over a territory in Eastern Europe over which the Russian Orthodox Church claimed to have the exclusive canonical jurisdiction, such territory being a part of the former Soviet Union, which upon its collapse had become an independent state. The break of communion in 1996 was made by Moscow unilaterally, as in 2018.

== September 2018: Russian Orthodox synod's "retaliatory measures" and the aftermath ==
On 14 September 2018, in response to the appointment of two exarchs (deputies of the Ecumenical Patriarch) in Ukraine, Daniel (Zelinsky) and Hilarion (Rudnyk), and in response to the Ecumenical Patriarchate's plans to grant autocephalous status to the Eastern Orthodox church in Ukraine, the Holy Synod of the Russian Orthodox Church held an extraordinary session to take "retaliatory measures" and decided:

# To suspend the liturgical prayerful commemoration of Patriarch Bartholomew of Constantinople.

1. To suspend concelebration with hierarchs of the Patriarchate of Constantinople.
2. To suspend the participation of the Russian Orthodox Church in all Episcopal Assemblies, theological dialogues, multilateral commissions and other structures chaired or co-chaired by representatives of the Patriarchate of Constantinople.
3. To adopt a statement of the Holy Synod concerning the uncanonical actions of the Patriarchate of Constantinople in Ukraine.

A statement was released the same day explaining the situation and the sanctions taken to protest against the Ecumenical Patriarch's behavior.

On the same day, ROC Metropolitan Hilarion (Alfeyev) clarified the situation in an interview, stating that this decision is not a rupture of Eucharistic communion and does not concern the laity, but nonetheless added:

But we refuse to concelebrate with hierarchs of the Patriarchate of Constantinople since every time they mention the name of their Patriarch during the liturgy while we have suspended it. [...]

We do not think, of course, that all this will finally shut the door for dialogue, but our today's decision is a signal to the Patriarchate of Constantinople that if the actions of this kind continue, we will have to break the Eucharistic communion entirely. [...]

[A]fter the breaking-off of the Eucharistic communion, at least a half of this 300-million-strong population will no longer recognize him as even the first among equals.

On 23 September 2018 Patriarch Bartholomew, during a Divine Liturgy he was celebrating in the Saint Fokas Orthodox church declared that he "had sent a message that Ukraine would receive autocephaly as soon as possible, since it is entitled to it"

On 30 September 2018, in an interview to Izvestia Daily published on the official website of the Moscow Patriarchate's Department for External Church Relations, Metropolitan Hilarion commented: "The Russian Church does not need to fear isolation. If Constantinople continues its anti-canonical actions, it will place itself outside the canonical space, outside the understanding of church order that distinguishes the Orthodox Church."

On 2 October 2018, Patriarch Kirill of the ROC sent a letter to all the autocephalous Orthodox churches to ask them to hold a "Pan-Orthodox discussion" concerning the question of Ukraine's autocephaly.

On 5 October 2018, the Metropolitan Pavel, head of the Belarusian Orthodox Church (exarchate of the Russian Orthodox Church), announced there would be a meeting of the Holy Synod of the Russian Orthodox Church on 15 October in Minsk. He said that "The situation with the Orthodox Church in Ukraine will be on the agenda of the meeting". This meeting had been announced previously on 7 January 2018 and was at the time "most likely to take place in mid October."

On 9 October 2018, Metropolitan Hilarion, chairman of the Department of External Church Relations of the Russian Orthodox Church warned that "if the project for Ukrainian autocephaly is carried through, it will mean a tragic and possibly irretrievable schism of the whole Orthodoxy." He added that

ignoring sacred canons shakes up the whole system of the church organism. Schismatics in other Local Churches are well aware that if autocephaly is given to the Ukrainian schismatics, it will be possible to repeat the same scenario anywhere. That is why we state that autocephaly in Ukraine will not be "the healing of the schism" but its legalization and encouragement.

== Autocephaly of the Eastern Orthodox church in Ukraine ==
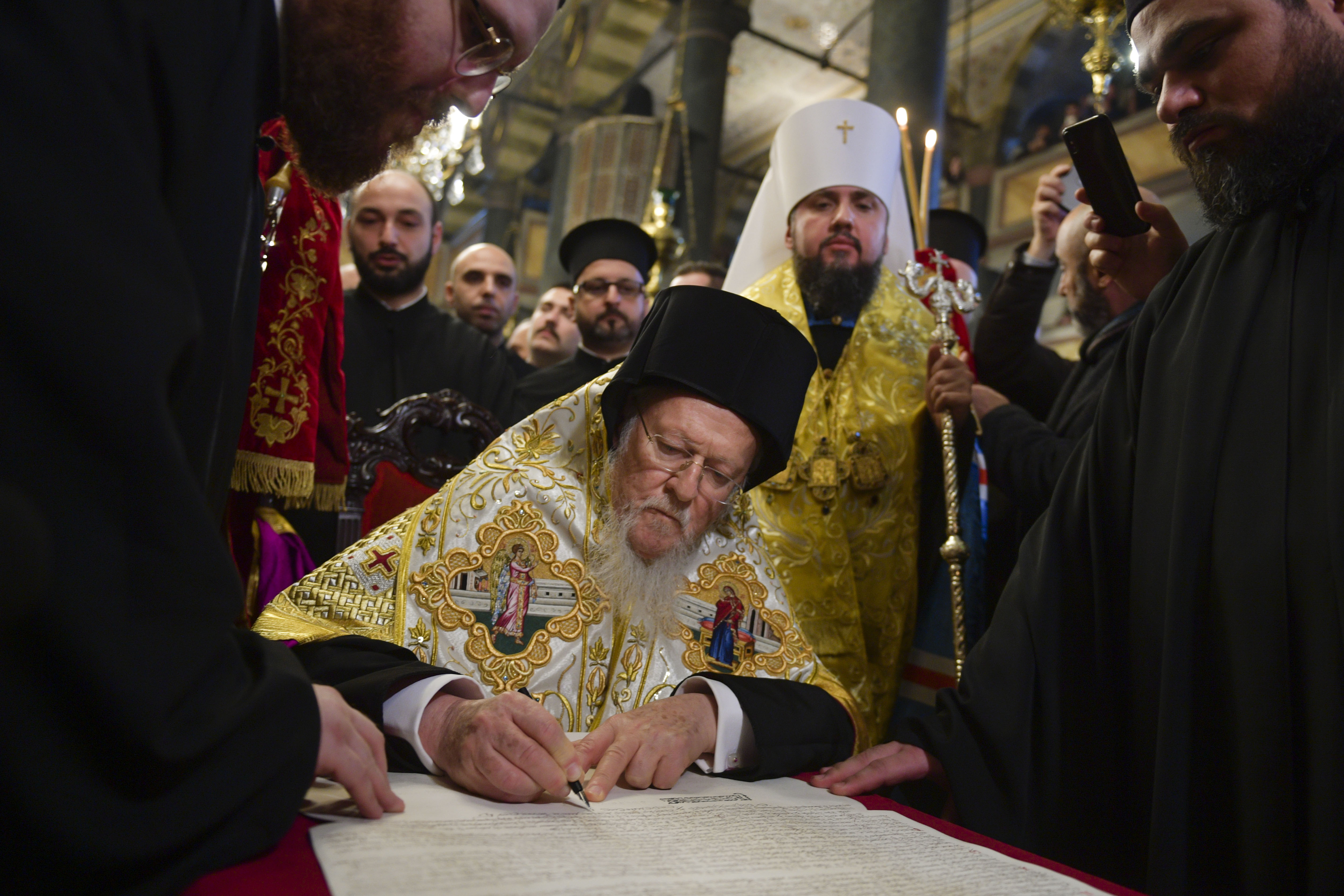
Patriarch Bartholomew signing the tomos of autocephaly of the OCU. Epiphanius of Kyiv (wearing a white klobuk) stands behind him.

On 11 October 2018 the synod of the Ecumenical Patriarchate announced that it would grant autocephaly to the "Church of Ukraine" in the future. In the same decision the Holy Synod announced that it will immediately: reestablish a stauropegion (church body ruled directly by the Ecumenical Patriarch) in Kiev, revoke the legal binding of the letter of 1686, and lift the excommunications which affected clergy and faithful of two Ukrainian Orthodox churches (the UOC-KP and the UAOC). This decision led the Holy Synod of the Russian Orthodox Church to break full communion with the Ecumenical Patriarchate on 15 October 2018, which marked the beginning of the 2018 Moscow–Constantinople schism. Support for the grant of autocephaly had been expressed by the Ukrainian President and the Verkhovna Rada in June 2018, and before that by the Rada in June 2016.

On 15 December 2018, the Orthodox Church of Ukraine (OCU) was formed after a unification council between the UAOC, the UOC-KP, and two bishops of the UOC-MP; Epiphanius was elected primate of the OCU during this unification council. Most of the hierarchs of the UOC-MP ignored the council and over half of them had sent invites back to the Ecumenical Patriarch.

On 5 January 2019, Bartholomew I, the Ecumenical Patriarch of Constantinople, signed the official decree (tomos) that granted autocephaly (independence) to the Orthodox Church of Ukraine and officially established the Orthodox Church of Ukraine. On 6 January, after a Liturgy celebrated by Metropolitan Epiphanius and Patriarch Bartholomew, Patriarch Bartholomew read the tomos of the OCU and then gave it to Metropolitan Epiphanius. On 8 January 2019, the tomos was brought back to Istanbul so that all the members of the Holy Synod of the Ecumenical Patriarchate could sign the tomos. The tomos was signed by all members of the Holy Synod of the Ecumenical Patriarchate on 9 January 2019. The tomos, signed by all members of the Holy Synod of the Ecumenical Patriarchate, was brought back to Ukraine on the morning of 10 January 2019.

Right after the granting of the tomos of autocephaly to the OCU (6 January 2019), a leadership conflict arose within the OCU. The local council of the UOC-KP (convened by Filaret) decided to cancel the decisions of the unification council of the Orthodox churches of Ukraine on 20 June 2019.

== Break of communions with the other autocephalous Eastern Orthodox Churches by the Russian Orthodox Church ==
=== Break of communion with the Ecumenical Patriarchate ===
Current status of the 2018 schism by Orthodox Church jurisdiction. Recognises OCU autocephaly Concelebrated with or commemorated OCU primate in Divine Liturgy diptych No definitive statements yet on OCU Does not recognise OCU autocephaly Territorial disputes between Moscow Patriarchate (MP) and Ecumenical Patriarchate of Constantinople or Romanian Orthodox Church.

On 15 October 2018, the Holy Synod of the Russian Orthodox Church, meeting in Minsk, decided to cut all ties with the Constantinople Patriarchate. This decision forbade for any member of the ROC (both clergy and laity) joint participation in all sacraments, including communion, baptism, and marriage, at any church worldwide controlled by Constantinople. At the time of the schism, the Russian Orthodox Church had over 150 million followers, more than half of all Eastern Orthodox Christians. The same day, after the synod, a briefing for journalists was given by Metropolitan Hilarion, chairman of the Department of External Church Relations of the Russian Orthodox Church, in which he declared that "the decision on complete cessation of the Eucharistic communion with the Patriarchate of Constantinople was taken today." On 18 October 2018, the Russian Orthodox Church Outside Russia has expressed "complete support of the position taken by the Holy Synod of the Patriarchate of Moscow, following its meeting of 15th October 2018" and severed Eucharistic communion with the Ecumenical Patriarchate.

The break of communion was done in response to a decision of the Holy synod of the Ecumenical Patriarchate on 11 October 2018 which confirmed the intention of moving towards granting autocephaly (independence) to the Eastern Orthodox Church in Ukraine, and to immediately: reestablish a stauropegion (church body ruled directly by the Ecumenical Patriarch) in Kiev, revoke the legal binding of the letter of 1686, and lift the excommunications which affected clergy and faithful of two Ukrainian Orthodox churches.

Doctor in theology Cyrill Govorun of the UOC-MP argued that the break of communion between the churches of Moscow and Constantinople did not constitute a real schism (like the schism of 1054), but a "slit". The American Protestant magazine Christianity Today called the break of communion between the Ecumenical Patriarchate and the Russian Orthodox Church the "biggest schism since 1054" and "the biggest Christian schism since the Protestant Reformation"

On 17 October, Metropolitan Hilarion, head of the Moscow Patriarchate Department for External Church Relations, was interviewed by the BBC Russian Service; this interview was published on the official website of the Department of External Church Relations of the Russian Orthodox Church the very same day. Hilarion declared: "As of today, we have very clearly stated: the fact that the Patriarchate of Constantinople has recognized a schismatic structure means for us that Constantinople itself is now in schism. It has identified itself with a schism. Accordingly, we cannot have the full Eucharistic communion with it." Hilarion added that when members of the Russian Orthodox of Moscow Patriarchate pay visits to the monasteries on Mount Athos, they cannot participate in the sacraments (for example, receive communion), and promised punishment to any priests who participate in the divine services together with the local clergy. It is known that Russia makes large donations to the monasteries on Athos: the sum of $200 million was announced by a source close to the Moscow Patriarchate and confirmed by Hilarion in his interview. Hilarion hinted that "[h]istory shows that when Athos is concerned over something, the monasteries on the Holy Mountain do find ways to inform the Patriarch of Constantinople about it" and called on Russian businessmen to switch donations to Russian sacred places.

On 29 December, during an interview to the channel Russia-24, Metropolitan Hilarion declared the Patriarch of Moscow had informed during the last meeting of the Supreme Diocesan Assembly of Moscow that the faithful of the ROC could communicate in the territory of the Mount Athos, but only in the Saint Panteleimon Monastery. The territory of the Mount Athos is under the jurisdiction of the Ecumenical Patriarchate. Hilarion declared the Saint Panteleimon Monastery "belongs to the Constantinople Church, as do all monasteries on Mt. Athos, but we know that it was built with Russian money by Russian monks and houses a Russian and Ukrainian monastic brotherhood, all rites are performed in a Slavic language and the laity who come there may take communion in it [...] But not in other Athos monasteries".

On 27 September 2021, Patriarch Kirill of Moscow declared he was "very much upset by the fact that today the Patriarch of Constantinople has lapsed into schism because he took communion together with schismatics and recognized self-ordained clergy who do not have lawful consecration by canonical hierarchs".

On 3 December, Ecumenical Patriarch, despite the decision of the Moscow Patriarchate, states there is no schism between Moscow and Constantinople.

=== Break of communion with the Archbishop of Athens ===
On 17 October 2019, the Holy Synod of the ROC reacted to the announcement that the Church of Greece had recognized the OCU. The Holy Synod stated: "If the Ukrainian schism is really recognized by the Greek Orthodox Church and its Primate – either in the form of a joint service, liturgical commemoration of the leader of the schism or sending official letters to them – it will be a sad testimony to the deepening division in the family of local Orthodox Churches. [...] We cease the prayer and Eucharistic communion with those bishops of the Greek Church who have entered or will enter into communion with representatives of the Ukrainian non-canonical schismatic communities. [...] the Holy Synod of the Russian Orthodox Church authorizes his Holiness Patriarch Kirill of Moscow and all Russia to stop the commemoration of the name of His Beatitude Archbishop of Athens and the entire Greece in the diptychs if the Primate of the Greek Church begins to commemorate the head of one of the Ukrainian schismatic groups during divine services or takes other actions indicating the recognition of the Ukrainian schism." In the same statement, the Holy Synod announced that the ROC would not be blessing pilgrimages of faithfuls of the ROC to Greek dioceses whose hierarchs are in communion with representatives of the OCU.

On 21 October 2019, Archbishop Ieronymos II of Athens and all Greece, the primate of the Church of Greece, sent a peaceful letter to Epiphanius of Kyiv, the primate of the OCU. This decision was supported by the whole hierarchy (bishops) of the Church of Greece, minus 7 Metropolitans; the Metropolitan of Piraeus later said he in fact did not support this decision, explaining: "My phrase 'I disagree but support the archbishop' was distorted beyond recognition." This decision meant that the Church of Greece recognized the OCU. The head of the external relations department of the ROC, Metropolitan Hilarion, stated that the ROC regretted this decision and that "the Greek Church is not independent, there is no full autocephaly, full independence, half of its hierarchs are hierarchs of the Constantinople Patriarchate, it does not have its own external policy, and therefore it always follows in the footsteps of the Constantinople Patriarchate." Hilarion stated that he hoped "no other regional church will follow this sad example." Thereafter, the Pilgrim Centre of the Patriarchate of Moscow, which is the official pilgrimage centre of the Moscow Patriarchate, released a list of dioceses of the Church of Greece which were considered "undesirable for pilgrimage" and to which the pilgrims of the Russian Orthodox Church were "not blessed" to go in pilgrimage. This list namely contained the diocese of Athens of the primate of the Church of Greece. This list was done on the basis of 17 October 2019 decision of the Holy Synod of the ROC not to bless pilgrimages to dioceses whose hierarchs enter in communion with representatives of the OCU.

On 2 November, Metropolitan Hilarion stated: "We said that if the archbishop of Athens officially recognizes the Ukrainian schism, his name will be removed from the diptychs of the Russian Orthodox Church. What does that mean? It means that the patriarch will not mention the archbishop of Athens in his services, the same way as he is not mentioning the patriarch of Constantinople. I think he will not be mentioned this coming Sunday when the patriarch holds his service. That means we are stopping Eucharistic communion with the archbishop of Athens."

On Sunday, 3 November 2019, Patriarch Kirill did not mention the primate of the Church of Greece in the liturgy, removing him from the diptych.

=== Break of communion with the Patriarch of Alexandria ===
On 8 November 2019, the Moscow Patriarchate announced that Patriarch Kirill would stop commemorating the Patriarch of Alexandria and all Africa after the latter and his Church recognized the OCU that same day. On 25 November 2019, Patriarch Kirill of Moscow temporarily suspended the Moscow mission of the Patriarchate of Alexandria and All Africa. The future closing of the representation of the Patriarchate of Alexandria in Moscow was announced.

On 6 December 2019, the Holy Synod of the UOC-MP announced it had severed eucharistic communion "with the Patriarchate of Constantinople and with the Churches and hierarchs who have recognised the schismatics"

On 24 December 2019, Metropolitan Hilarion said that "[i]f the Patriarchate of Alexandria sides with the schism, then we might, of course, have to create parishes for our believers, because they won't be able to take communion at churches of the Patriarchate of Alexandria." Two days later, the Synod of the ROC in Moscow announced it severed full communion with the Patriarch of Alexandria and ceased commemorating him. In addition, the Synod of Moscow decided to suspend the activities of the metochion (embassy) of the Alexandrian Patriarchate under the Moscow Patriarchate. It was also decided that the Representation of the Patriarchate of Moscow under the Patriarchate of Alexandria in Cairo would become a parish of the ROC. As for the parishes of the ROC in Africa, they will be removed from the jurisdiction of the Patriarchate of Alexandria and will be granted stauropegial status, that is, they will be transferred to the direct subordination of the head of the ROC, Patriarch Kirill.

On 23 November 2022, the Holy Synod of the Patriarchate of Alexandria, meeting under the chairmanship of Patriarch Theodore II, decided the following things:

1. Interruption of commemoration of the Patriarch of Moscow, Cyril, until he comes back to his senses.

2. Deposition of the Russian Metropolitan Klin Leonidas, accused of interfering in the territory of an autocephalous Orthodox Church (Alexandria).

3. Condemnation of the ideology of the Russkiy mir as contrary to the teachings of Christ.

=== Break of communion with the Archbishop of Cyprus ===
On 20 November 2020, the Holy Synod of the ROC declared that Patriarch Kirill can no longer commemorate Archbishop Chrysostomos II of Cyprus as a result of Chrysostomos' commemoration of Epiphanius on 24 October 2020.

== Further escalation ==
=== Russian priests in Turkey ===
On 10 November 2018, Metropolitan Hilarion, heads of the Moscow Patriarchate's Office for External Relations said during a TV program on Russia-24 that the ROC had no choice but to "send priests of the Russian Orthodox Church" to Turkey, "[a]nd this will continue as long as the Patriarch of Constantinople is in schism". He said the ROC did not do so before because Turkey is a territory of the Ecumenical Patriarchate, but that the ROC now does because the Ecumenical Patriarchate is in schism.

On 12 November 2018, it was reported that the first priest, Father George Sergeev was sent by Patriarch Kirill to Istanbul (Turkey) "at the request of Russian believers who live in Turkey". On the same day, the Russian Orthodox Church announced a divine liturgy had been held on 11 November in Istanbul and would be regularly held. The ROC also reported the words of the priest who had led the divine liturgy who said that after the 15 October 2018 decision of the Ecumenical Patriarchate, numerous Russian Orthodox believers of Turkey had asked the Moscow Patriarchate to provide them with "pastoral care". On 14 December the Ecumenical Patriarchate published a statement by Metropolitan Sotirios of Pisidia in which he condemned the plans of the ROC priest to celebrate a Divine Liturgy in Belek (Turkey) with the help of the Russian consulate and without the permission of the Ecumenical Patriarchate, which has canonical jurisdiction over this territory.

On 30 December 2018, Interfax reported that the ROC was building a church on the territory of the embassy of Russia in Ankara. As of 2025, ROC has 5 priests in Turkiye and those priests celebrate divine liturgy in major cities like Istanbul, Ankara, İzmir, Antalya, Bursa.

=== Dissolution of the AROCWE ===
On 27 November 2018, the Ecumenical Patriarchate decided to dissolve the Archdiocese of Russian Orthodox churches in Western Europe (AROCWE) "thereby entrusting its faithful to the Hierarchs of the Ecumenical Throne in Europe". ROC officials responded with a reminder of the 2003 proposal of Alexy II to move to the Moscow Patriarchate. This decision was made without any official requests from the hierarchs of the diocese and caused confusion. On 15 December, Pastoral Assembly of AROCWE decided to call an Extraordinary General Assembly (EGA), scheduled for 23 February 2019. On 23 February 191 out of the 206 voters of EGA voted against the dissolution.

At the next Extraordinary General Assembly on 7 September 2019, 104 voters out of the 186 (58.1%) voted in favor of the AROCWE being subordinated to the Moscow Patriarchate, but that was less than two-thirds of the votes needed to make such a decision. Despite this, the head of AROCWE John (Renneteau) on 14 September personally came under the jurisdiction of the Moscow Patriarchate. On 3 November, the AROCWE delegation in Moscow received a letter on the reunification of the archdiocese with the Moscow Patriarchate. Some of AROCWE members joined the newly established "Vicariate of Russian Tradition of the Metropolis of France" which remained faithful to the Ecumenical Patriarchate.

=== Creation of the PEWE and the PESEA ===
On 26 November 2018, Metropolitan Hilarion declared that the ROC would send a priest in South Korea and declared the plans "to create a full-fledged parish", because until the 1950s in Korea was a Russian Spiritual Mission whose faithful were in the 1950s transferred to the Ecumenical Patriarchate's jurisdiction. The priest was scheduled to be sent by the end of the year.

On 28 December 2018, in response to the Ecumenical Patriarchate's actions in Ukraine, the Holy Synod of the Russian Orthodox Church decided to create the Patriarchal Exarchate in Western Europe (PEWE), the Spanish-Portuguese diocese, as well as the Patriarchal Exarchate in South-East Asia (PESEA). On the same day, in an interview with Russia-24 channel, Metropolitan Hilarion, head of the Synodal Department for External Church Relations of the ROC, declared the ROC "will now act as if they [Constantinople] do not exist at all because our purpose is missionary, our task is to educate, we are creating these structures for ministerial care about our flock, there can be no such deterring factors here", and that the ROC will take charge of the Orthodox faithfuls of its diaspora instead of the Ecumenical Patriarchate.

=== Further protests by the ROC ===
On 26 February, during the first 2019 session of the Holy Synod of the Moscow Patriarchate, the Holy synod adopted a statement saying that the granting of the tomos by the Ecumenical Patriarchate "to the so-called 'Orthodox church of Ukraine,' created artificially by a merger of two schismatic organizations, deepened the division between [Eastern] Orthodox Christians in Ukraine and worsened ever more considerably the inter-confessional relations." The ROC also blamed the action of the Ukrainian parliament regarding the UOC-MP.

On 7 October 2019, the ROC officially released comments by the Secretariat of the Biblical and Theological Synodal Commission of the Russian Orthodox Church. "The document discusses the problems of apostolic succession among schismatic "hierarchs", the limits of application of the oikonomia principle, issues of the lack of legitimacy of the OCU, the distortion of the role of the first bishop in the Orthodox Church, and explains the suspension of Eucharistic communion."

=== Omission of commemoration of all other primates by Patriarch Kirill ===
On 7 January 2019, during the festive Christmas liturgy in the Cathedral of Christ the Savior, Patriarch Kirill of the ROC did not mention a single name of the primates of other local Orthodox Churches, with whom the ROC is in canonical communion. Such commemoration (Note: In Greek, it is called "diptych".) is demanded by a church charter and is a centuries-old tradition. In contrast to this, the head of the newly created Orthodox Church of Ukraine, Metropolitan Epiphanius of Kyiv, solemnly listed the names of all the primates, including the "Most Holy Patriarch of Russia Kirill". Epiphanius later explained that he had done this after the Ecumenical Patriarch had instructed him (Epiphanius) to do so, and that Filaret had instructed him not to mention Kirill.

On 20 November 2019, during the patriarchal liturgy, Patriarch Kirill of Moscow did not commemorate by name any of the primates of the local Eastern Orthodox Churches, saying only "Remember, Lord, the Orthodox Patriarchs."

On 21 November 2019, Patriarch Kyrill and Patriarch Theophilos III of Jerusalem concelebrated a liturgy together. During this liturgy, they commemorated each others, but did not commemorate any of the other Eastern Orthodox primates.

=== Moscow Patriarchate receives priests from the Patriarchate of Alexandria ===
In September 2021, after Patriarch Theodore II of Alexandria concelebrated a liturgy with Met. Epiphanius of Kyiv of the OCU, the Holy Synod of the ROC declared the ROC was accepting priests who wanted to leave the Church of Alexandria to join the ROC due to their disapproval of the recognition of the OCU by the Church of Alexandria.

On 29 December 2021, the Holy Synod of the Russian Orthodox Church under Patriarch Kirill announced that 102 priests of the Patriarchate of Alexandria, from eight African countries, would be received into their jurisdiction, and that Dioceses of the Russian Orthodox Church would be erected in Africa under an Exarchate.

=== Russian invasion of Ukraine and other churches ===
In October 2019, the Latvian Orthodox Autonomous Church (LAOC) became an officially registered church. LAOC split from the Latvian Orthodox Church (LOC-MP) and declared its loyalty to Ecumenical Patriarchate but was never recognized by it.

On 27 December 2019, the Parliament of Montenegro passed a law which forces churches to prove their ownership over property gained before 1920 which was linked to the plans of the government to establish a Montenegrin Orthodox Church independent from the Serbian Orthodox Church. In December 2019, Ecumenical Patriarch Bartholomew announced that he "will never grant autocephaly to the so-called Montenegrin Orthodox Church". After the 2020 election, the "Law on Freedom of Religion" was changed again by a pro-Serbian majority. On 8 July 2022, the Montenegrin government approved an agreement which obliges it to register all Orthodox churches and monasteries as belonging to the SOC and it has to seek SOC's approval before giving permission to the construction of new ones.

In May 2022, the Council of bishops of the UOC-MP has cutting ties with ROC over handling, perceived betrayal, and consequences of the 2022 Russian invasion of Ukraine. In May 2022, the Lithuanian Orthodox Church asked Moscow to grant it autonomy. The ROC appointed to committee to consider it. A new request was made in March 2026.

On 22 July 2022, there was a Call for the exclusion of the Russian Orthodox Church from the World Council of Churches. Signers included members of the Romanian and Greek churches; Sergei Chapnin of the ROC itself; priest Sergey Berezhnoy, Oleksandr Brodetskyi, protopriest Andriy Dudchenko, protopriest Vitaliy Eismonth, Liudmyla Fylypovych and Konstantin Sigov of the OCU; Georgi Kapriev of the Bulgarian Church; Gayle Woloschak of the Ukrainian Orthodox Church of the USA and Paul Gavrilyuk of the Orthodox Church in America.

In 2022, the Serbian Orthodox Church (SOC) granted the Macedonian Orthodox Church autocephaly, a right traditionally belonging to the Ecumenical Patriarch. Primate Stefan rejected Constantinople's conditions for independence which included a name change and the recognition of the OCU. Even though, they accepted the church into the communion, Constantinople and Church of Greece rejected the autocephaly. Besides SOC, their autocephaly is recognized by the ROC, OCU, the Romanian Orthodox Church, Antiochian Orthodox Church, Orthodox Church of the Czech Lands and Slovakia, Bulgarian Orthodox Church and the Polish Orthodox Church as of 2023. In April 2024, Metropolitan Kyrillos of the Ecumenical Patriarchate challenged the validity of the tomos of autocephaly granted by the Serbian church and accused it of having a pro-Russian orientation.

On 9 September 2022, the Latvian parliament adopted amendments to the Law on the LOC-MP affirming the full independence of the Latvian Orthodox Church with all its dioceses, parishes, and institutions from any church authority outside Latvia (autocephalous church). By 1 October, the Chancery of the President must be notified of the appointment of the Head of the church, metropolitans, archbishops, and bishops, and by 31 October, the Church will have to align its statutes with the amendments made to the Law on the status of the church. The decision came a few days after the president of Latvia, Egils Levits, tabled the bill saying that "this bill restores the historical status of the Orthodox Church of Latvia", stressing that the independence of the Church established "by the 6(19) July 1921 Tomos issued by Patriarch of Moscow and all Russia Tikhon to Archbishop Jānis Pommers and the Cabinet of Ministers Regulation of 8 October 1926 on the Status of the Orthodox Church".

In December 2022, George was elected new Archbishop of Cyprus by the Holy Synod, who wanted to continue the pro-western course. In the popular vote, Athanasios and Isaias, who opposed the recognition of the OCU got 35.7% and 18.1% respectively, while George got 18.4% of the vote. In June 2024, pro-Russian candidate Daniel of Vidin narrowly beat Grigory of Vratsa, who was seen as more neutral with 69 to 66 votes and became Patriarch of All Bulgaria.

In February 2023, Bartholomew re-installed five Lithuanian priests of the ROC which were expelled for "canonical violations" but he accused the ROC of having them expelled for their opposition to the war. In early 2024, the Ecumenical Patriarchate founded the Exarchate of the Ecumenical Patriarchate in Lithuania challenging the Russian Orthodox Diocese of Lithuania. It was legally recognized by the Lithuanian government on 7 February 2024.

The Romanian Orthodox Church came into some conflict with both the ROC and OCU, additionally to lesser extend with the OUC-KP, over the jurisdiction over Moldova and Bukovina respectively.

On 20 August 2024, the Verkhovna Rada passed the Law of Ukraine "On the Protection of the Constitutional Order in the Field of Activities of Religious Organizations" banning the UOC-MP. UOC-MP was accused of "justifying the crimes against their own people" and the law is said to "serve the protection of the national security and freedom of religion". The same day, Estonian Orthodox Church of the Moscow Patriarchate (EOC-MP) declared unilaterally their autocephaly. A request to legally change their name to "Estonian Christian Orthodox Church" (Estonian: Eesti Kristlik Õigeusu Kiri) was denied. On 9 April 2025, the Riigikogu passed a bill banning ties of churches to the ROC in regards to the EOC-MP. On 24 April, Alar Karis vetoed the law, while Minister of the Interior Igor Taro announced that he will continue the plans. In July 2026, the Estonian Ministry of the Interior gave the EOC-MP six months to break ties with the ROC.

On 27 May 2025, the UOC-MP held their third anniversary of the Feofaniyevsky Council where it declared autocephaly but a proposal to fully break with the ROC and return to a communion with Constantinople was not passed.

In June 2025, a conflict broke out between the pro-Russian Abkhazian Orthodox Church and the pro-Constantinople Holy Metropolis of Abkhazia over the New Athos Monastery, neither are recognised by the other Orthodox churches.

== Reactions ==
=== International community ===
- Russia:
  - On 12 October 2018, the Russian president, Vladimir Putin, "held an operational meeting with the permanent members of the Security Council" (the Security Council of Russia) that discussed "a wide range of domestic and foreign policy issues, including the situation around the Russian Orthodox Church in Ukraine", according to Putin's press secretary Dmitry Peskov. On 31 January 2019, concerning Ukraine Putin declared that the Russian authorities "consider any interference in church affairs absolutely unacceptable." Putin added: "We have respected and will respect the independence of church affairs, especially in a neighboring sovereign country. And yet we reserve the right to respond and do all we can to protect human rights, including the right to freedom of religion".
  - Russian Foreign Minister Sergey Lavrov stated that "only by strengthening the unity of the Orthodox people can the position of the ROC in Ukraine and the SOC in Montenegro be strengthened" and in May 2020, spokeswoman for the Ministry of Foreign Affairs Maria Zakharova accused the United States of intending a schism in the Balkans (Montenegro).
- Ukraine:
  - Ukraine's president, Petro Poroshenko, enthusiastically welcomed Constantinople's October decision, and presented the Ukrainian Church's independence as part of Ukraine's wider conflict with Russia, and Ukraine's desire to integrate with the West by joining the European Union and NATO. On 28 November 2018, Ukrainian President Poroshenko declared that the Kerch Strait incident was provoked by Russia in order to force Ukraine to declare martial law and therefore to prevent Ukraine from receiving its tomos of autocephaly.
  - Ukraine's president Volodymyr Zelenskyy stated that draft law No. 8371 is important for strengthening Ukrainian spiritual independence, and he plans to discuss it with Ecumenical Patriarch Bartholomew.
- United States:
  - The Secretary of State, Mike Pompeo, urged all sides to respect the independence of "Ukraine's Orthodox community", reiterating the United States' "strong support for religious freedom and the freedom of members of religious groups".
- Belarus: the President of Belarus, the country in which the synod of the Russian Orthodox Church which decided to sever communion with the Ecumenical Patriarchate took place, met members of the synod of the Russian Orthodox Church on 15 October 2018 after the ROC's decision to sever communion with the Ecumenical Patriarchate.
- Latvia: In September 2022, the Latvian President stated that the bill which declared the Latvian Orthodox Church autocephalous aims to restore its "historical status" and that "based on the rule of law the orthodox community needs its own autonomous and independent church."
- Lithuania:
  - In March 2023, the Lithuanian Prime Minister claimed that "as Russia began its full-scale aggression in Ukraine with the open and active support of the Moscow Patriarch Kirill, some Lithuanian Orthodox can no longer in good conscience remain part of the Moscow Patriarchy" and supported the establishment of a Exarchate of the Ecumenical Patriarchate in Lithuania.
  - On 12 July 2024, only representatives of the Ecumenical Patriarchate were invited to the inauguration of Lithuanian President Gitanas Nausėda because of the "attitude towards the war in Ukraine" of ROC's Metropolitan Innokentiy.
- Greece: In November 2024, the Greek government approved the creation of 600 organizational positions for the Ecumenical Patriarchate, the Patriarchate of Alexandria, the Patriarchate of Jerusalem, and the Saint Catherine's Monastery in face of Russian pressure.

=== Reactions of the Eastern Orthodox churches ===
Numerous Eastern Orthodox churches took position concerning the question of the canonical jurisdiction over Ukraine, whether before or after this schism.

== Canonical issues ==
The schism has its root in a dispute over who between the Patriarchate of Moscow and the Patriarchate of Constantinople has canonical jurisdiction over the See of Kiev and, therefore, which patriarchate has canonical jurisdiction over the territory of Ukraine. "[T]he principal argument proposed [concerning the granting of the ecclesiastical status of autocephaly to Ukraine by the Ecumenical Patriarchate] is that Ukraine 'constitutes the canonical territory of the Patriarchate of Moscow' and that, consequently, such an act on the part of the Ecumenical Patriarchate would comprise an 'intervention' into a foreign ecclesiastical jurisdiction." The Patriarchate of Moscow's claim of canonical jurisdiction is based mostly on two documents: the Patriarchal and Synodal "Act" or "Letter of Issue" of 1686, and a 1686 Patriarchal Letter to the Kings of Russia. Both those documents are reproduced in the "Appendix" section of a study published by the Ecumenical Patriarch called The Ecumenical Throne and the Ukrainian Church – The Documents Speak. The Church of Constantinople claims the Church of Constantinople has canonical jurisdiction over the See of Kiev and that the documents upon which the Russian Orthodox Church bases its claim of jurisdiction over said See of Kiev do not support the ROC's claim.

On 1 July 2018, the Patriarch Bartholomew said that Constantinople was the Mother church of the Orthodox Church of Ukraine and declared that

Constantinople never ceded the territory of Ukraine to anyone by means of some ecclesiastical Act, but only granted to the Patriarch of Moscow the right of ordination or transfer of the Metropolitan of Kiev on the condition that the Metropolitan of Kiev should be elected by a Clergy-Laity Congress and commemorate the Ecumenical Patriarch. [It is written] in the Tomos of autocephaly, which was granted by the Mother Church [Constantinople] to the Church of Poland: "... original separation from our Throne of the Metropolis of Kiev and of the two Orthodox churches of Lithuania and Poland, which depend on it, and their annexation to the Holy Church of Moscow, in no way occurred according to the binding canonical regulations, nor was the agreement respected concerning the full ecclesial independence of the Metropolitan of Kiev, who bears the title of Exarch of the Ecumenical Throne..."

The ROC considers this argument "groundless".

=== Ecumenical Patriarchate's claims ===
The Ecumenical Patriarchate issued a document authored by various clerics and theologians called The Ecumenical Throne and the Ukrainian Church – The Documents Speak. This document analyzes canonical historic documents (namely the Patriarchal and Synodal "Act" or "Letter of Issue" of 1686 and the 1686 Patriarchal Letter to the Kings of Russia) to see if the claim over the See of Kiev by the Patriarchate of Moscow is canonical or not. (Note: The date of publication of The Ecumenical Throne and the Ukrainian Church – The Documents Speak is unknown, but the earliest online version can be found on 28 September 2018 on the website of the Greek Orthodox Archidiocese of America in PDF in English as well as in Greek. In September 2018, the Holy Orthodox Archdiocese of Italy and Malta issued a translation which was on 17 October published on the official Italian website of the Archdiocese of Russian Orthodox churches in Western Europe. The Ecumenical Throne and the Ukrainian Church was translated in Ukrainian as of 6 October 2018.)

The Ecumenical Throne and the Ukrainian Church concludes that:

Through the autocratic abolition of the commemoration of the Ecumenical Patriarch by each Metropolitan of Kiev, the de jure dependence of the Metropolis of Kiev (and the Church of Ukraine) on the Ecumenical Patriarchate was arbitrarily rendered an annexation and amalgamation of Ukraine to the Patriarchate of Moscow.

All these events took place in a period when the Ecumenical Throne was in deep turmoil and incapable "on account of the circumstances of the time to raise its voice against such capricious actions" [...] The Church of Ukraine never ceased to constitute de jure canonical territory of the Ecumenical Patriarchate.[...]

The Ecumenical Patriarchate was always aware of this despite the fact that, "on account of the circumstances of the time", it tolerated the arbitrary actions by the Patriarchate of Moscow. [...]

The Ecumenical Patriarchate is entitled and obliged to assume the appropriate maternal care for the Church of Ukraine in every situation where this is deemed necessary.

On 27 December 2016, Konstantinos Vetochnikov (Note: Two PhD in theology, PhD in history and member of the Collège de France, participated in Augustus 2016 to the 23rd International Congress of Byzantine Studies in Belgrade where he made a report on the subject of the transfer of the See of Kiev, and helped the Ecumenical Patriarchate on The Ecumenical Throne and the Ukrainian Church) wrote that the transfer of the See of Kiev from the authority of the Ecumenical Patriarchate to the authority of the Russian Orthodox Church "never took place". Later, Vetoshnikov made an analysis of the arguments of the Russian Orthodox Church. He pointed out that, according to the strict dogmatic approach (akribeia, ἀκρίβεια), the whole territory of Russia was originally subjected to the Ecumenical Patriarchate. After Muscovy had gone into schism in the 15th century, it received autocephaly according to a more flexible approach (oikonomia, οἰκονομία) to heal this schism. The Metropolitan of Kiev at the same time remained within the jurisdiction of Constantinople. Then, also according to the oikonomia approach, the right to ordain Metropolitans of Kiev was transferred to the Patriarch of Moscow. This was not a change in the boundaries of the Moscow Patriarchate eparchy, as it was issued by a document of a lower level (ekdosis, ἐκδόσεως), which was used for various temporary solutions. For pastoral reasons, the Ecumenical Patriarchate subsequently did not assert its rights to this territory. But after the dissolution of the Soviet Union there was a split among the Orthodox of Ukraine, and the Russian Church for 30 years failed to overcome this split. And now, also for pastoral reasons, the Ecumenical Patriarchate was forced to act in accordance with the principle of akribeia, and so it decided to abolish the right to ordain Metropolitans of Kiev which had been earlier transferred to the Moscow Patriarchate in accordance with oikonomia.

=== Arguments against the Ecumenical Patriarchate's claims ===
On 20 August 2018, the pro-Moscow anonymous site Union of Orthodox Journalists analysed the Ecumenical Patriarchate's claim of jurisdiction over Ukraine and concluded the See of Kiev had been transferred to the Patriarchate of Moscow. They added that even if the Ecumenical Patriarchate decided to abrogate the 1686 transfer, the territory covered in 1686 by the See of Kiev's territory was "a far cry from the Ukrainian Orthodox Church of today" and covered less than half of Ukraine's current territory.

In its 15 October 2018 official statement, the Russian Orthodox Church gave counterarguments to the Ecumenical Patriarch's arguments.

Metropolitan Hilarion, chairman of the Moscow Patriarchate's Department for External Church Relations, declared in an interview that Constantinople's plan to "grant Autocephaly to a part of the Russian Orthodox Church [...] that once was subordinate to Constantinople [...] runs counter to historic truth". His argument is that the entire territory of Ukraine has not been under Constantinople's jurisdiction for 300 years because the Kiev metropolis that was incorporated into the Moscow Patriarchate in 1686 was much smaller (it did not include Donbass, Odesa and some other regions) and therefore does not coincide with the present-day territory of the Ukrainian Orthodox Church. A similar argument was given on 13 November in a live phone interview to Radio Liberty by the Head of the Information and Education Department of the UOC-MP, Archbishop Clement.

Archbishop Clement of the UOC-MP considers that "to revoke the letter on the transfer of the Kiev Metropolis in 1686 is the same as to cancel the decisions of the Ecumenical Councils of the 4th or 7th centuries."

On 8 November 2018, the Union of Orthodox Journalists analyzed the same documents as The Ecumenical Throne and the Ukrainian Church (the Patriarchal and Synodal "Act" or "Letter of Issue" of 1686 and the 1686 Patriarchal Letter to the Kings of Russia) and again concluded that the See of Kiev had been "completely transferred to the jurisdiction of the Russian Church in 1686".

=== Possibility of a pan-Orthodox synaxis on the question of Ukraine ===
The possibility of a pan-Orthodox synaxis (consultative assembly or conference) has been raised before and after the official break of communion.

On 29 September 2018, Alexander Volkov, the press secretary of the Patriarch of Moscow, declared that the local Eastern Orthodox churches may initiate a pan-Orthodox Synaxis on the issue of granting autocephaly to the Church in Ukraine, however the problem was that the convening such a synaxis is "a prerogative of the First among the Equals, that is, the Ecumenical Patriarch". Volkov noted that

Others [sic] forms [of pan-Orthodox synaxis] exist, too [...] There are the elders of the Church who can take this task upon themselves. [...] If you look at the Diptychs [the table specifying the order of commemorating the Primates of Orthodox Churches – TASS], the next in line [after the Ecumenical Patriarch – TASS] is the Greek Orthodox Patriarch of Alexandria. Or else, there is the so-called synaxis of the eldest Patriarchs– of Alexandria, Jerusalem and Antioch

On 7 November, answering the question "Who could, for instance, convene a Pan-Orthodox Council and chair it?", Metropolitan Hilarion declared in an interview, which was published on the official website of the Russian Orthodox Church's Department for External Church Relations, that it was "obvious" that the Ecumenical Patriarch could not chair a Pan-Orthodox Council since "the most important problems in the Orthodox world are linked with precisely his anti-canonical activity".

On 4 December, when asked about the fact that convoking a pan-Orthodox council was a prerogative of the Ecumenical Patriarch, Metropolitan Hilarion replied:

which canons ? [...] I believe those canons do not exist, the Ecumenical councils were not convoked by the Ecumenical Patriarch, they were convoked by the emperor. The fact the Patriarch of Constantinople has been given the right to convey councils in the 20th century is the result of a consensus reached by the local Orthodox churches. It is not at a personal initiative that the council is convoked, but only with the consent of all the local churches. We had, until recently, the first among equals, that is the Patriarch of Constantinople, who convoked the councils in the name [...] of the local Orthodox churches. Now, the unifying element is no more the Patriarchate of Constantinople which, so to speak, autodestroyed itself. It is its decision. [...] We have to think about the future: who will convoke the councils, will it be the Patriarch of Alexandria, or another Patriarch, or else we will generally not have a council? Whatever. The Patriarch of Constantinople, as long as he stays in schism, even if he convokes a council the Russian Orthodox Church will not take part in it.

In an interview published on 21 February 2019 in the Serbian magazine Politika, the Ecumenical Patriarch said: "As for the provision of autocephaly with the consent of other Orthodox Churches, this did not happen, because it is not a tradition in our Church. All the Tomoses of the autocephaly that were granted to the newly created autocephalous churches (Russia, Serbia, Romania, Bulgaria, Georgia, Athens, Warsaw, Tirana and Presov) were provided by the Ecumenical Patriarchate, and this was not preceded by any agreement or negotiation at the Pan-Orthodox level."

Thus far, Patriarch John X of the Greek Orthodox Patriarchate of Antioch, Patriarch Irinej of the Serbian Orthodox Church, Archbishop Chrysostomos II of the Church of Cyprus, Metropolitan Sawa (Hrycuniak) of the Polish Orthodox Church, Metropolitan Tikhon of the Orthodox Church in America, (Note: Autocephaly for the Orthodox Church in America was granted by the Russian Orthodox Church in 1970 and is not yet fully recognized by all the other Orthodox churches (including the Ecumenical Patriarchate of Constantinople).) Archbishop Anastasios, primate of the Albanian Orthodox Church, three hierarchs of the Bulgarian Orthodox Church (Metropolitans Gabriel of Lovech, John of Varna and Veliki Preslav, and Daniel of Vedin), and the Holy Synod of the Orthodox Church of the Czech Lands and Slovakia have expressed their desire for a pan-Orthodox synaxis or pan-Orthodox council over the question of Ukraine in various statements. On 12 November 2018, the Assembly of Bishops of the Serbian Orthodox Church published a communiqué in which they requested the convocation of a Pan-Orthodox Synod.

In 2019, the Ecumenical Patriarch declared in a letter to Patriarch John X of Antioch that he would not convene a pan-Orthodox council on the question of Ukraine.

==== Proposal of the Patriarch of Jerusalem ====
On 21 November 2019, Patriarch Theophilos III of Jerusalem announced he would like to gather in Jordan with the other Eastern Orthodox primates "in the spirit of fellowship – koinonia – so that counsel will be taken together for the preservation of our unity in Eucharistic communion."

This initiative was welcomed by the ROC; Metropolitan Hilarion, head of the DECR, also added that the Patriarchate of Jerusalem had a "historic primacy" within the Eastern Orthodox Church.

In December 2019, the Holy Synods of the OCCLS and of the ROC supported the proposal of meeting.

On 22 November, the primate of the Church of Greece declined the invitation. At the beginning of January, the primate of the Church of Cyprus said he had not replied to the invitation because he "considered it prudent not to answer" and did not consider this meeting a "serious act", and added that "only the Ecumenical Patriarch, no one else" had the right to convene such a council. A few days later, the answer of the Ecumenical Patriarch to the letter of invitation of the Patriarch of Jerusalem was reported; the Ecumenical Patriarch stated he refused the invitation and asked the Patriarch of Jerusalem to stop his initiative of meeting. A few days later, the primate of the Church of Greece reiterated that he would not attend Patriarch Theophilos III's meeting. Later, it was reported that the Orthodox Churches of Albania, Poland, Alexandria, Georgia, Bulgaria and Antioch had stated they would not come. The Romanian Orthodox Church said it would be present at the gathering, but would not be presented by its Patriarch but by a delegation.

The gathering took place on 26 February 2020. Were present the delegations of: the ROC with Patriarch Kirill as leader, the Church of Jerusalem with Patriarch Theophilos as leader, the Serbian Church with Patriarch Irinej as leader, the OCCLS with primate Met. Rastislav as leader, the Polish Church with Abp. Abel (Poplavsky) of Lublin as leader, and the Romanian Church with Met. Nifon Mihăiță as leader. After the gathering, the participants released a common statement.

== See also ==
=== Eastern Orthodoxy ===
- 15th–16th century Moscow–Constantinople schism
- 1996 Moscow–Constantinople schism
- 2022 Cypriot archiepiscopal election
- Autocephaly of the Orthodox Church of Ukraine
- Bulgarian schism
- Phyletism
- Unification council of the Eastern Orthodox churches of Ukraine

=== Politics ===
- Russian irredentism
- Russian nationalism
- Third Rome
- Ukrainian nationalism

== Notes ==
Explanatory notes

Complementary information
