= George of Cyprus =

George of Cyprus may refer to:

- George of Cyprus (geographer) (6th century)
- George of Cyprus, birth name of Patriarch Gregory II of Constantinople (1283–1289)
- George (archbishop of Cyprus) (since 2023)
