= List of archbishops of Cyprus =

Archbishop of Nova Justiniana and All Cyprus
- Archbishopric

Eastern Orthodox
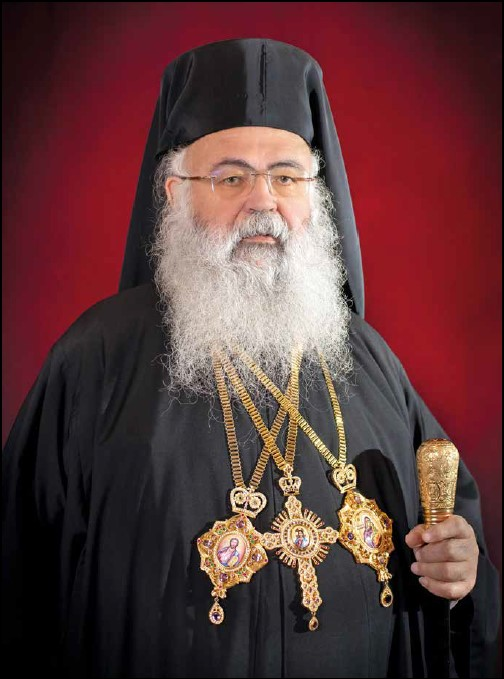
- Incumbent: George since 24 December 2022

Location
- Country: Cyprus

Information
- Established: 1st century (ancient); 1571 (modern)

Website
- churchofcyprus.org.cy

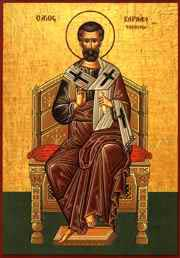
St. Barnabas

The archbishop of Cyprus (officially the archbishop of Nova Justiniana and All Cyprus) is the head of the Church of Cyprus. Since 2023 the incumbent archbishop has been George III.

== History ==
According to tradition, the Church of Cyprus was founded by Saint Barnabas in 45 AD. Cyprus was under the jurisdiction of the Church of Jerusalem until 325. The Church of Cyprus was declared autocephalous on 30 July 431 by the Council of Ephesus. Its autocephaly was abolished in 1260 but restored in 1571.

== Archbishops of Cyprus ==
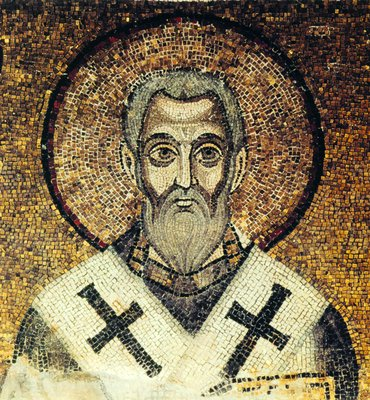
St. Epiphanios I

=== First Autocephalous Period (325 (431) –1260) ===
- Gelasios I (325)
- Epiphanius of Salamis (368)
- Stavrinos I (403)
- Troilos (431)
- Reginos (431)
- Olympios I (449)
- Stavrinos II (457)
- Anthemios (470)
- Olympios II (During the reign of Justinian)
- Philoxenos (During the reign of Justinian)
- Damianos (During the reign of Justinian)
- Sophronios I (During the reign of Justinian)
- Gregorios (During the reign of Justinian)
- Arkadios (During the reign of Justinian)
- Theophanes I
- Plutarch (620)
- Arkadios II (630)
- Serghios (643)
- Epiphanios II (681)
- John I (691)
- George I (754)
- Constantine (783)
- Akakios (after 787)
- Gelasios II (after 787 and likely successor of Akakios)
- Theophanes II (early 9th century and likely successor of Gelasios Ii)
- John II (early 9th century and likely successor of Theophanes II and predecessor either of Barnabas or Epiphanios III)
- Epiphanios III (890)
- Basileos
- Nicholas, later Ecumenical Patriarch of Constantinople
- John III (1151)
- Barnabas II (1175)
- Sophronios II (1191)
- Isaias (1209)
- Neophytos I (1222)
- Germanos I (1260)

=== Non-autocephalous period (1260–1571) ===
During the Lusignan and later Venetian rule from 1260 to 1571, the Church of Cyprus ceased to be autocephalous and came under the direct rule of the Papacy; its fourteen dioceses were reduced to four until after the Ottoman conquest in 1571, when the Ottomans, for expedient administrative reasons, restored to the Orthodox Church of Cyprus all its previous privileges and rights.

=== Second autocephalous period (1571–present) ===
Image	Name	Term began	Term ended
	Timotheos	1572	1580
	Lavrentios	1580	1592
	Neophytos II	1592	1592
	Athanasios I	1592	1600
	Benjamin	1600	1606
	Christodoulos I	1606	1641
	Nikephorus	1641	1674
	Ilarion Kigalas	1674	1682
	Christodoulos II	1682	1691
	Jacob I	1691	1695
	Germanos II	1695	1705
	Athanasios II, later Patriarch of Antioch	1705	1709
	Jacob II	1709	1718
	Silvestre	1718	1734
	Philotheos	1734	1759
	Paissios	1759	1767
	Chrysanthos	1767	1810
	Kyprianos	1810	1821
	Joachim	1821	1824
	Damaskinos	1824	1827
	Panaretos	1827	1840
	Ioannikos	1840	1849
	Kyrillos I	1849	1854
	Makarios I	1854	1865
	Sophronios III	1865	1909
	Kyrillos II	1909	1916
	Kyrillos III	1916	1933
	Leontios	1947	1947
	Makarios II	1947	1950
	Makarios III, first President of the Republic of Cyprus	1950	1977
	Chrysostomos I	1977	2006
	Chrysostomos II	2006	2022
	George	2022	incumbent

== See also ==
- Catholic Church in Cyprus
