= 2022 Cypriot archiepiscopal election =

Cypriot Archiepiscopal election

The 2022 Cypriot archiepiscopal election was held on 18 December 2022 to elect the new archbishop of the Church of Cyprus following the death of the previous archbishop, Chrysostomos II. After the two rounds of voting, George III of Cyprus was elected as the new archbishop of Cyprus.

== Background and proceedings ==
Chrysostomos II died on 7 November 2022 from intestinal cancer at the age of 81. A six-day national mourning was proclaimed in Cyprus after the death of the hierarch. He was buried on 12 November 2022 in the Cathedral of the Apostle Barnabas in Nicosia, where the Archbishops of Cyprus are buried. The ceremony was presided by George of Paphos and participated, among others, the President of Cyprus, Bartholomew I, the Patriarch of Alexandria, the Archbishop of Greece and the President of Greece.

The Church of Cyprus was one of the last Orthodox Churches to practice the apostolic process of episcopal election. The procedure (previously reserved for a college of grand electors, theologians, priests and bishops) was democratized during the establishment of the new Charter of the Church of Cyprus by Chrysostomos II, which opened the vote to universal suffrage.

Orthodox faithful of all nationalities residing on the island of Cyprus for more than a year and registered on the electoral lists of the Holy Synod elect representatives of the clergy so that they may have a chance to become the next archbishop of Cyprus, the highest Orthodox authority of the Church of Cyprus.

Those who are eligible are all archpriests of the Church of Cyprus or priests and deacons who have: a degree in theology from a recognized Orthodox school, ten years of ministry and completed thirty-five years of age.

The three candidates with the best results in universal suffrage then enter a triumvirate. The second part of the election then takes place behind closed doors by the Holy Synod. At the end of this vote, which decides between the three elected, the candidate who received the majority of the votes of the Holy Synod becomes Archbishop of Cyprus and is enthroned within fifteen days of the decision. Generally, two of the three elected are the representatives of the majority tendencies within the archdiocese - often, the third person is chosen by the Holy Synod to prevent one of the two factions prevailing over the other, and allows building a consensus, even if it varies according to the elections.

On 28 November, an extraordinary meeting of the Cyprus Synod was held, at which it was decided not to allow foreigners to vote, contrary to the provision adopted in 2010 that not only Orthodox Cypriots, but also those who have lived in the country for more than a year and are an active parishioner of the church can participate in the election of an archbishop. It was said that this decision was made "due to unforeseen issues and exceeding the established deadlines, the Holy Synod decided by the necessary majority of votes to amend the Charter not to accept applications for registration of foreign Orthodox Christians in the electoral lists." The Russian-speaking population of Cyprus at that time numbered about 50 thousand people.

== Candidates ==
Several metropolitans expressed interest in the elections before the archbishop's death: they were George of Paphos, Athanasios of Limassol, Isaiah of Tamassos as well as the metropolitans of Constantias, Morphou, Karpasia and Kykkos. At the beginning, the Metropolitan of Famagusta (Constantias), Basil, was the only one to have officially declared himself as a candidate.

Finally, the metropolitans George of Paphos, Athanasios of Limassol, Isaias of Tamassos, Chrysostomos of Kyrenia, Neophytos of Morphou, and Basil of Constantias declared themselves as running for the office.

== Positions of the candidates ==
The fundamental question in the power relations between the candidates was the relationship to be maintained in the question of the autocephaly of the Ukrainian Church, where the late Archbishop of Cyprus, Chrysostomos II, had ardently defended it, condemning explicitly the Russian invasion of Ukraine and opposing Russian attempts to interfere in other Orthodox Churches, including the Church of Cyprus. Before he died, he opposed the Metropolitans of Limassol and Morphou saying they were not "sane" and calling them "protestants" for their refusal to concelebrate with him, despite the fact that he was their hierarchical superior.

Metropolitan George of Paphos was a long-time friend of Ecumenical Patriarch Bartholomew I. From the beginning of the question of the autocephaly of the Ukrainian Church, he supported the decision taken by the Ecumenical Patriarchate. The same was true for the Metropolitan of Constantias, Basil, who had also always maintained privileged relations with the Ecumenical Patriarchate and the Church of Greece. He declared to be one of the candidates that the late Chrysostomos II would have liked to see succeed him.

Metropolitan Athanasios of Limassol was one of the candidates of the pro-Russian Church faction; he had already stood for election in 2006 and lost to Chrysostomos II. A strong presence of Russian oligarchs in Limassol reinforced its links with the Kremlin. He had a Russian-style church built in Cyprus to cater to Russian pilgrims and tourists, who were an important part of his income, at least until the sanctions against Russia.

The Metropolitan of Tamassos, Isaiah, was also a candidate close to the Russian government; he studied in Russia, where he developed relationships with financial and ecclesiastical actors in Russia. He, like the Metropolitan of Limassol, had a Russian-style church built with the money of a Russian oligarch and was even rebuked by Chrysostomos II when he officiated a liturgy in honor of Tsar Nicolas II, who is not recognized as a saint by the Church of Cyprus, in Russian liturgical vestments.

The Metropolitan of Kykkos, Nicephorus, defended a pro-Russian Church position; he opposed the autocephaly of the Ukrainian Church with the metropolitans of Limassol and Tamassos. He had lost the archbishopric elections of 2006 against Chrysostomos II. The latter accused him, along with the other two metropolitans, of serving the interests of Russia for personal matters and not for the good of Orthodoxy and to be "protestants".

The Metropolitan of Morphou, meanwhile, was known for his many stances, claiming to find prophecies of the COVID-19 pandemic in Asterix, for example, or that anal sex lead to children becoming homosexuals. He supported the Russian invasion of Ukraine stating that "a war must be fought to purge the children of the devil".

== Conflicts between candidates ==
From the first days of the electoral campaign, conflicts emerged between several candidates. The Metropolitan of Limassol, Athanasios, declared to the press: "I do not wish to be elected, but if the Church entrusts me with such a ministry, I would accept it" to which George of Paphos replied that "it is somewhat uncomfortable, when the Archbishop is not yet buried, to discuss such matters".

A new conflict broke out during the meeting of the Holy Synod on 14 November 2022, the lesser-known candidates wishing to have additional time to conduct their electoral campaign, beyond the 40 days provided for by the Charter of the Church of Cyprus. This request was denied by a vote of 10 to 6.

== Results ==
Candidate	Votes	%
Athanasios of Limassol	58,573	35.68
George of Paphos	30,188	18.39
Isaias of Tamassos	29,708	18.10
Basil of Constantias	24,281	14.79
Neophytos of Morphou	16,097	9.80
Chrysostomos of Kyrenia	5,327	3.24
Total	164,174	100.00
Valid votes	164,174	99.09
Invalid/blank votes	1,514	0.91
Total votes	165,688	100.00
Registered voters/turnout	548,793	30.19

After the popular vote, the metropolitans Athanasios of Limassol, George of Paphos and Isaias of Tamassos were the three winners. They proceeded to the second round where they had to gather 9 votes within the Holy Synod of the Church of Cyprus to be chosen as the next Archbishop of Cyprus.

Finally, it was George of Paphos who was elected Archbishop of Cyprus with 11 out of 16 votes.
