= Chrysostomos I of Cyprus =

Archbishop of Cyprus from 1977 to 2006

His Beatitude Chrysostomos I
- Archbishop of Nova Justiniana and All Cyprus
- Official portrait
- Church: Church of Cyprus
- Diocese: Cyprus
- Installed: 13 November 1977
- Term ended: 17 May 2006
- Predecessor: Makarios III
- Successor: Chysostomos II

Personal details
- Born: Christoforos Aristodimou; 27 September 1927 Statos, British Cyprus (now Cyprus)
- Died: 22 December 2007 (aged 80) Nicosia, Cyprus
- Buried: Saint Spyridon Cemetery, Nicosia
- Denomination: Eastern Orthodox Church
- Residence: Nicosia, Cyprus
- Occupation: Archbishop
- Profession: Theologian
- Education: University of Athens

Chrysostomos I, born Christoforos Aristodimou (Greek: Χριστόφορος Αριστοδήμου; 27 September 1927 – 22 December 2007), was the Archbishop of Cyprus from 1977 to 2006.

== Biography ==
He was born in the village of Statos in Paphos, British Cyprus. By the scholarship of Kykkos Monastery, where he served as a monk, he finished the Pancyprian Gymnasium (High School) in 1950 and he studied theology and literature in the University of Athens. He then returned to Kykkos Monastery and was ordained deacon in February 1951. In October 1961, he was ordained priest and returned to the Pancyprian Gymnasium where he taught theology for 5 years.

In 1968, he was elected bishop of Constantia before becoming Bishop of Paphos in July 1973. On 12 November 1977, he was elected Archbishop of Cyprus in succession to the President and Archbishop of Cyprus, Makarios III, who had died the same year. Chrysostomos was known for his vigorous opposition to the decriminalization of homosexuality in Cyprus, stating "The Church condemns homosexuality as a sinful and repulsive act because it is contrary to the spirit of Scripture and the law of nature."

In April 2000, he suffered a severe head injury when he fell from the staircase of the Archiepiscopal Palace and never recovered. In 2004, it became known that he suffered from Alzheimer's disease and he fell into a coma the following year.

He remained Head of the Church of Cyprus due to lack of provision in canon law for cases of incapacity. In early 2006, the Cypriot bishops asked the Ecumenical Patriarch of Constantinople to convoke a Panorthodox Synod to decide what was to be done since his condition was irreversible and he was still in a coma.

A Pan-Orthodox Synod was convoked by Ecumenical Patriarch Bartholomew I of Constantinople in Chambésy (Switzerland) in May 2006 and it was decided that Chrysostomos was to be removed from office due to serious health problems, while retaining his honorific titles. Bishop of Paphos Chrysostomos was elected as locum tenens and Archiepiscopal elections were proclaimed for 24 September 2006. Chrysostomos II became the new Archbishop of Cyprus.

Chrysostomos I died on 22 December 2007.

== See also ==
- List of Archbishops of Cyprus

Religious titles
Preceded by Makarios III	Archbishop of Cyprus; 1977–2006	Succeeded by Chrysostomos II
