= Sergei Chapnin =

Russian journalist and editor (born 1968)

- Сергей Валерьевич Чапнин
- Chapnin in 2019
- Born: 7 June 1968; Moscow
- Education: Moscow State University
- Occupations: Journalist, editor, curator
- Employer: Fordham University
- Website: Official website

Sergei Valeryevich Chapnin (Russian: Сергей Валерьевич Чапнин; born 7 June 1968) is a Russian journalist, editor, curator, and commentator on the Russian Orthodox Church. He was executive editor of the Journal of the Moscow Patriarchate from 2009 to 2015 and previously edited the church newspaper Church Herald. His dismissal in December 2015 followed public criticism of the church's leadership and its relationship with the Russian state.

Chapnin is director of communications at the Orthodox Christian Studies Center at Fordham University and chief editor of Dary (The Gifts), an almanac of contemporary Christian culture. His writings examine post-Soviet church life, the political uses of religion, and religious persecution in Russia.

== Career ==
=== Journalism and church publishing ===
Chapnin was born in Moscow in 1968. He graduated from the Faculty of Journalism at Moscow State University and also studied at Saint Tikhon's Theological Institute. During the 1990s, he worked for Kommersant and Nezavisimaya Gazeta, covering religious life in Russia.

In 2001, at the invitation of Patriarch Alexy II, he became executive editor of Church Herald (Tserkovny Vestnik). He was appointed executive editor of the Journal of the Moscow Patriarchate, an official publication of the Russian Orthodox Church, in April 2009, and deputy chief editor of the Moscow Patriarchate Publishing House the following month. In 2010, he became secretary of the Church, State, and Society Commission of the church's Inter-Conciliar Board.

=== Dismissal in 2015 ===
On 9 December 2015, Chapnin delivered a lecture at the Carnegie Moscow Center on Orthodoxy in public life, war, and violence. He criticized the concentration of public authority within the church leadership and argued that the church should distance itself from the state rather than exchange ideological support for government funding. He also warned about the use of religious language to justify war in Ukraine.

Later that month, he was removed from his editorial position. In an interview following his dismissal, Chapnin said that he had been informed on 16 December of a directive from Patriarch Kirill calling for his removal because of his "inappropriate statements". He said that his employment subsequently ended by mutual agreement. Although he acknowledged that the Carnegie lecture might have triggered the decision, he distinguished it from the underlying reasons for his dismissal.

In interviews after his dismissal, Chapnin said that he had previously received official warnings over his public criticism and had been effectively prevented from speaking at international conferences. He regarded his November 2015 essay "A Church of Empire" as a more substantial critique than the Carnegie lecture. Recalling his editorship, Chapnin said that Patriarch Kirill had initially supported his efforts to combine official reporting with an editorial space for discussion and personal views, but that such freedom had gradually narrowed. He described a "new silence" within the church, saying that priests and bishops had become reluctant to contribute even to the patriarchate's official journal.

=== Independent publishing and curatorial work ===
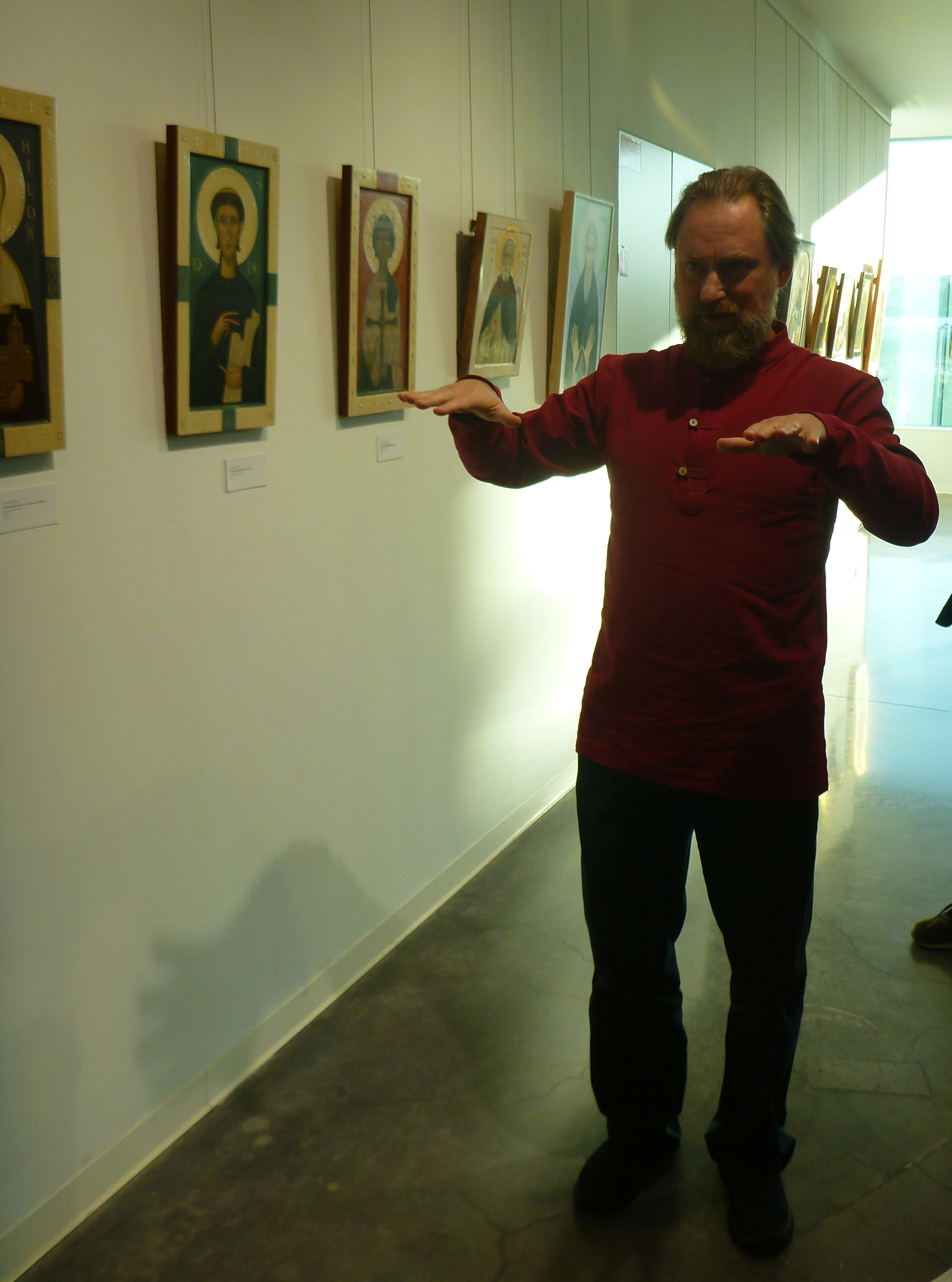
Chapnin lecturing at the Saints of the Undivided Church exhibition at the Yeltsin Center in Yekaterinburg, 6 August 2021

In 2013–2014, Chapnin and the artist Gor Chahal co-curated Dary, an exhibition of contemporary Christian art at the Shchusev Museum of Architecture in Moscow. The Artos fellowship, which Chapnin chairs, was formed in 2013 during preparations for the associated Christmas festival.

In 2014, Chapnin announced plans for an almanac, also called Dary, intended to develop the exhibition project beyond a catalogue. Artos began publishing the almanac in 2015. Chapnin is its editor-in-chief, and the art historian Irina Yazykova is its managing editor. It covers contemporary Christian art and the theology of the image, including icon painting, church architecture, literature, and film. His book The Church Revival: A Summary (2018) collected writings from 2012–2018 on developments within the Russian Orthodox Church and its relationship with society and the state.

Chapnin curated the international exhibition project Saints of the Undivided Church, featuring contemporary depictions of saints venerated in both Eastern and Western Christianity. It was shown in Minsk in 2017–2018, at New Valamo in Finland in 2019–2020, and at the Yeltsin Center in 2021. In January 2020, he and Yazykova co-curated Pour la vie du monde. Icônes contemporaines de Russie, d'Ukraine et d'ailleurs (For the Life of the World: Contemporary Icons from Russia, Ukraine and Elsewhere) at the Collège des Bernardins in Paris.

=== Work in the United States ===
Chapnin moved to the United States in 2022. That year, he joined Fordham University's Orthodox Christian Studies Center, where he became director of communications and an editor of Public Orthodoxy.

In November 2023, he curated Beauty during Wartime and Before, an exhibition of contemporary Ukrainian Christian art at New York City's Sheen Center for Thought and Culture. In 2024–2025, he curated Wartime Beauty at Fordham's Refuge Gallery, featuring icons by Sofia Atlantova and Oleksandr Klymenko. Its central work was their eleven-icon Mariupol Deisis (2022), part of the Icons on Ammo Boxes project.

Chapnin participated in discussions of the Russian Orthodox Church's role in the war against Ukraine hosted by the Atlantic Council in September 2025 and the Council on Foreign Relations in December 2025.

In 2026, he published Religious Communities Under Pressure: Documenting Religious Persecution in Russia 2022–2026, with a foreword by Rowan Williams. The book examines state prosecution and ecclesiastical penalties imposed on clergy, laypeople, and congregations opposing Russia's war against Ukraine. It draws on court records, church decisions, and interviews.

George Weigel included the book in his 2026 summer reading list in First Things and cited it in a The Wall Street Journal column discussing the treatment of Orthodox clergy and laypeople who opposed the war. Reviewing the book in Providence, Siobhan Heekin-Canedy highlighted its documentation of the persecution of Orthodox opponents of the war and its distinction between the position of the church hierarchy and the views of dissenting clergy and believers.

In August 2026, Chapnin published Faith Under Pressure: Religious Repression and the Myth of "Traditional Values" in Putin's Russia, a report for the Free Russia Foundation examining the relationship between the state's traditional-values rhetoric and the repression of religious dissent, particularly among clergy opposing the war.

== Views ==
Chapnin has used the term "post-Soviet civil religion" to describe the combination of Orthodox identity, Soviet traditions, and support for Russian state power.

In his essay "A Church of Empire", published in First Things in November 2015, Chapnin contrasted the growth of parish communities and lay initiatives in the early post-Soviet period with the subsequent centralization of church life. He argued that an initial movement toward renewal and the rejection of Soviet practices had given way to bureaucratic expansion and closer partnership with the state. In his interpretation, the resulting civil religion provided ideological legitimacy for Russian political power rather than fulfilling the aims of the earlier religious revival.

In a 2025 interview, Chapnin argued that a future political transformation in Russia would also require the church to be refounded, rather than merely reformed. He advocated lustration within the church, including measures against clergy and bishops who had supported the war in Ukraine.

Speaking at the Council on Foreign Relations webinar in December 2025, Chapnin argued that the Russian Orthodox Church should not be treated as a monolithic institution. He distinguished its leadership, religious activists, and ordinary believers, emphasizing that the silence of the latter should not automatically be interpreted as support for state propaganda.

In an interview with journalist Yevgeny Kiselyov in January 2026, Chapnin argued that the Moscow Patriarchate's support for Russia's war against Ukraine represented a departure from Christian teaching. He described the official church leadership as serving state political interests, while distinguishing it from individual priests and believers whom he considered to remain faithful to Christian principles.

In his August 2026 Free Russia Foundation report, Chapnin argued that the state-sponsored idea of "traditional values" functioned as a political and religious ideology that legitimized violence and treated calls for peace by clergy as a challenge to the established order. In his analysis, this ideological framework contributed to restrictions on religious freedom.

== Awards ==
In 2008, Chapnin received the Russian Orthodox Church's Order of St. Daniel of Moscow, third class, in recognition of his work and on the occasion of his 40th birthday.

== Selected publications ==
- Chapnin, Sergei (2013). Церковь в постсоветской России: возрождение, качество веры, диалог с обществом [The Church in Post-Soviet Russia: Revival, "Quality of Faith", and Dialogue with Society] (in Russian). Moscow: Arefa.
- Chapnin, Sergei (2018). Церковное возрождение. Итоги [The Church Revival: A Summary] (in Russian). Moscow: Eksmo.
- Chapnin, Sergei (2020). "The Rhetoric of Traditional Values in Contemporary Russia". In Stoeckl, Kristina; Uzlaner, Dmitry (eds.). Postsecular Conflicts: Debating Tradition in Russia and the United States. Innsbruck: Innsbruck University Press. pp. 128–138. doi:10.15203/3187-99-3-11. ISBN 978-3-903187-99-3.
- Chapnin, Sergei (2023). "Post-Soviet Civil Religion as a Substitute for Orthodox Christianity". Studia Universitatis Babeș-Bolyai. Theologia Catholica Latina. 68 (1): 110–119. doi:10.24193/theol.cath.latina.2023.LXVIII.1.05.
- Chapnin, Sergei (2026). Religious Communities Under Pressure: Documenting Religious Persecution in Russia 2022–2026. Foreword by Rowan Williams. Albion Bixby Publishing. ISBN 979-8-9501690-3-8.
- Chapnin, Sergei (25 August 2026). Faith Under Pressure: Religious Repression and the Myth of "Traditional Values" in Putin's Russia (Report). Free Russia Foundation.
