= George (archbishop of Cyprus) =

Archbishop of Cyprus since 2023

His Beatitude George
- Archbishop of Nova Justiniana and All Cyprus
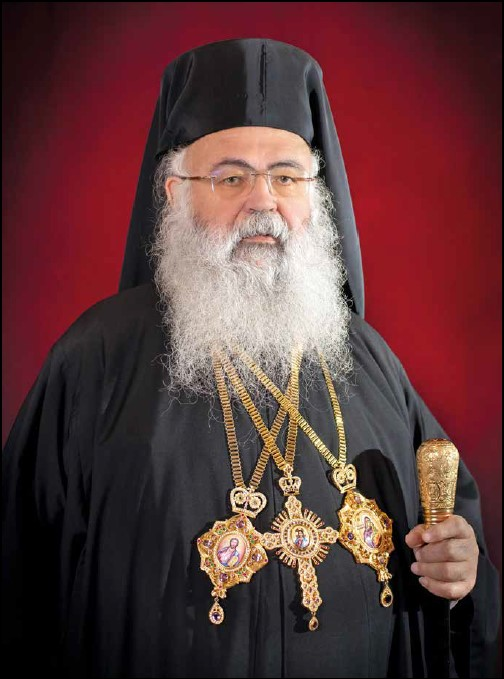
- George in 2024
- Church: Church of Cyprus
- Diocese: Cyprus
- Elected: 24 December 2022
- Installed: 8 January 2023
- Predecessor: Chrysostomos II

Personal details
- Born: Georgios Papachrysostomou; 25 May 1949 (age 77) Athienou, British Cyprus
- Denomination: Eastern Orthodox Christianity
- Residence: Nicosia, Cyprus
- Occupation: Archbishop
- Profession: Theologian
- Education: Kapodistrian University of Athens

Archbishop George (Greek: Αρχιεπίσκοπος Γεώργιος, Secular name Georgios Papachrysostomou) (b. 25 May 1949, Athienou, British Cyprus) is the current Archbishop of Nova Justiniana and All Cyprus since 8 January 2023.

He had been the Metropolitan of the Diocese of Paphos since 2006 and, from 7 November 2022, the locum tenens of the Church of Cyprus. On 24 December 2022, he was elected Archbishop of Cyprus. He "formally assumed his new duties" starting Sunday, 8 January 2023, after the enthronement ceremony at Saint Barnabas Cathedral in Nicosia, Cyprus.

== Early life ==
George was born to Greek Cypriot parents in Athienou in 1949, a village in Cyprus. He studied chemistry at the Kapodistrian University of Athens between 1968 and 1972, then he took theology courses there between 1976 and 1980. On 23 December 1984, he was ordained deacon in the Church of Cyprus and 17 May 1985, priest and Archimandrite by Archbishop Chrysostomos I of Cyprus.

== Clerical career ==
In 1994, he became Secretary of the Holy Synod of the Church of Cyprus. Alongside his ecclesiastical duties, he served as a chemistry teacher in Cypriot high schools. He was arrested and abused by the Turkish occupation troops in Cyprus and lodged an appeal in 1989 against Turkey at the European Court of Human Rights (n° 15300/891), which resulted in Turkey's first conviction (507/3.2.94) for violation of human rights in Cyprus.

== Episcopacy ==
In 1996, he was elected Bishop of Arsinois.

On 29 December 2006, he was unanimously elected to replace Archbishop Chrysostomos II of Cyprus as Metropolitan of Paphos. In the meantime, he became head of ecumenical affairs for the Church of Cyprus as well as head of its bioethics committee.

=== 2022 Archiepiscopal election ===
On 7 November 2022, following the death of Archbishop Chrysostomos II of Cyprus, he became locum tenens of the Arcbishporic of Nova Juntiniana and All Cyprus pending the episcopal election which were to determine the next archbishop. He announced the Archbishop's death on Cypriot and Greek television and called on all the faithful to pay their last respects to the late Archbishop.

Chrysostomos II was buried on 12 November 2022 in the Cathedral of the Apostle Barnabas in Nicosia, where the Archbishops of Cyprus are buried. The ceremony was presided by George of Paphos and participated, among others, the President of Cyprus, Ecumenical Patriarch Bartholomew I of Constantinople, Patriarch Theodore II of Alexandria, the Archbishop Ieronymos II of Athens and the President of Greece.

He was responsible for organizing the proper holding of the 2022 Cypriot archiepiscopal election.

=== As Archbishop of Cyprus ===
On 24 December 2022, he was elected Archbishop of Cyprus by the Holy Synod, with 11 votes in favor out of the 16. The Archbishop's enthronement ceremony took place on Sunday, 8 January 2023, at Saint Barnabas Cathedral in Nicosia, Cyprus. In his address, he stated that his goal is to "reinvigorate the Christian message in modern spiritual discourse", continue the "Church’s outreach to the poor", and "convey that scientific thought isn’t in conflict with the precepts of Christianity".

Eastern Orthodox Church titles
| Preceded by Chrysostomos II | Archbishop of Cyprus; 2022–present | Incumbent |
| Preceded by Chrysostomos II | Metropolitan of Paphos; 2006–2022 | Succeeded by Tychikos |
