= Chrysostomos II of Cyprus =

Archbishop of Cyprus from 2006 to 2022

His Beatitude Chrysostomos II
- Archbishop of Nova Justiniana and All Cyprus
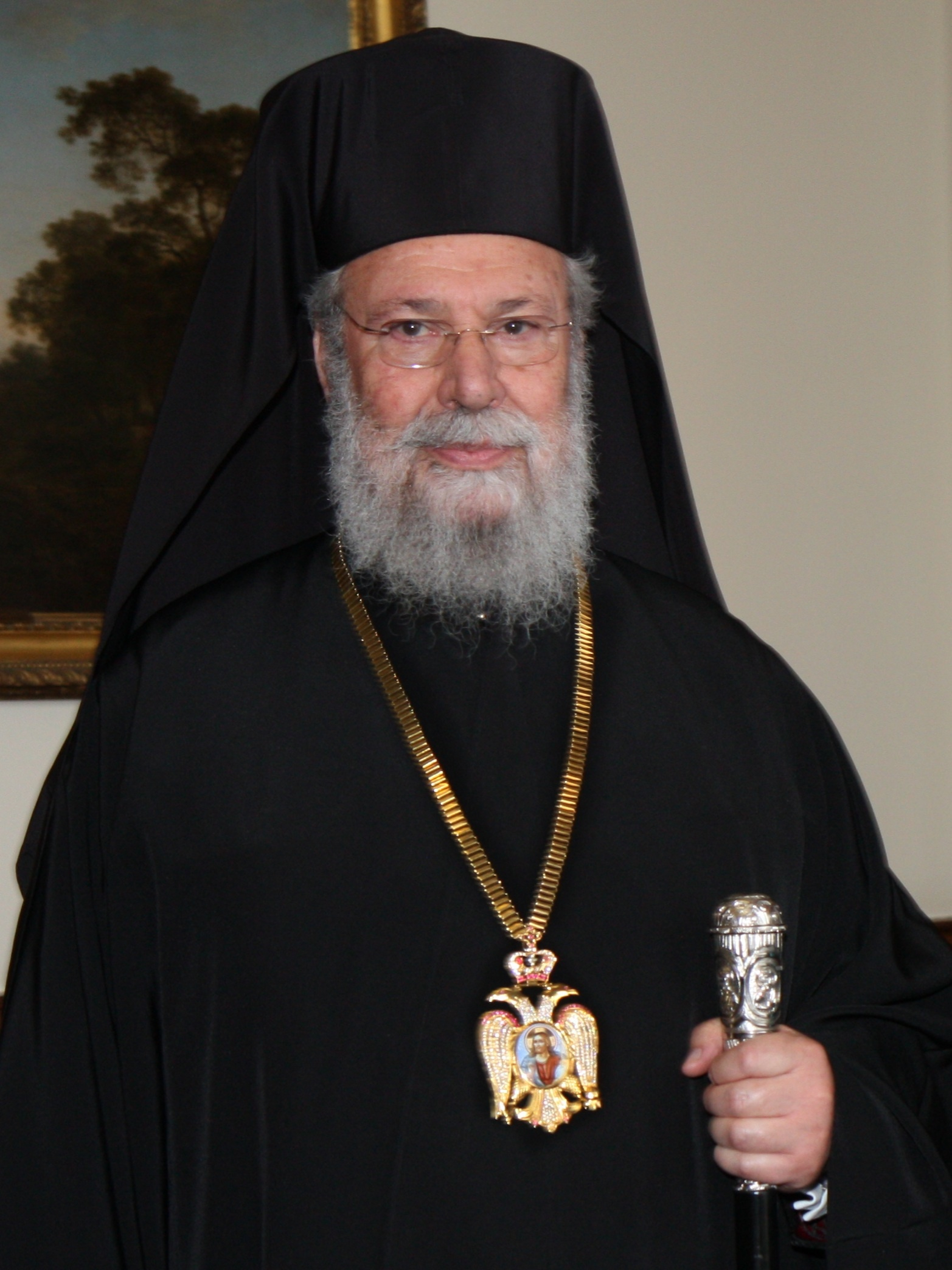
- Chrysostomos II in 2014
- Church: Church of Cyprus
- Diocese: Cyprus
- Installed: 12 November 2006
- Term ended: 7 November 2022
- Predecessor: Chysostomos I
- Successor: George

Personal details
- Born: Herodotos Dimitriou; 10 April 1941 Tala, British Cyprus
- Died: 7 November 2022 (aged 81) Nicosia, Cyprus
- Denomination: Eastern Orthodox Church
- Residence: Nicosia, Cyprus
- Occupation: Archbishop
- Profession: Theologian
- Education: University of Athens

Chrysostomos II (Greek: Χρυσόστομος Β΄; born Irodotos Dimitriou; Greek: Ηρόδοτος Δημητρίου; 10 April 1941 – 7 November 2022) was the Archbishop of Cyprus from 2006 to 2022.

== Clerical career ==
Chrysostomos was born in the village of Tala, Paphos, British Cyprus. At the age of 10 his father died, and two years later, after finishing his elementary education, he joined the monastery of Ayios Neophytos in Paphos. He also attended Paphos Gymnasium, graduating in 1963. On 3 November, of the same year, he was ordained deacon by the Bishop of Trimithounda, Georgios.

For five years, he served as trustee of the monastery and also worked on a ranch. In 1968 he enrolled in the Theological School of the University of Athens and graduated in 1972. On 19 October 1972, he was elected as the hegumen (abbot) of the Monastery of St. Neophytos. On 12 November 1972, he was ordained a presbyter and was elevated to hegumen by Archbishop Makarios III.

During Makarios III's presidency, he stood by the Archbishop against the Junta of Athens and the three metropolitans who led the Ecclesiastical coup.

Chrysostomos was elected Metropolitan (Bishop) of Paphos on 25 February 1978, and his episcopal consecration took place on 26 February 1978. During his time as a bishop he represented the Autocephalous of the Church of Cyprus in many conferences abroad, dedicated fifty new regional temples and chapels in the Paphos District, and maintained and attended all the churches of his metropolitan periphery. He also founded five Byzantine museums which contain the church treasures of the Paphos District. He played an important role in confronting and correcting irregularities and mismanagement in the Archdiocese, helping to preserve the Ecclesiastical fortune.

When Archbishop Chrysostomos I was removed from office (due to illness), Metropolitan Chrysostomos was elected as locum tenens, and Archiepiscopal elections were set for 24 September 2006. In October 2006, Metropolitan Chrysostomos became the new Archbishop of Cyprus as Chrysostomos II.

== Ministry and views ==
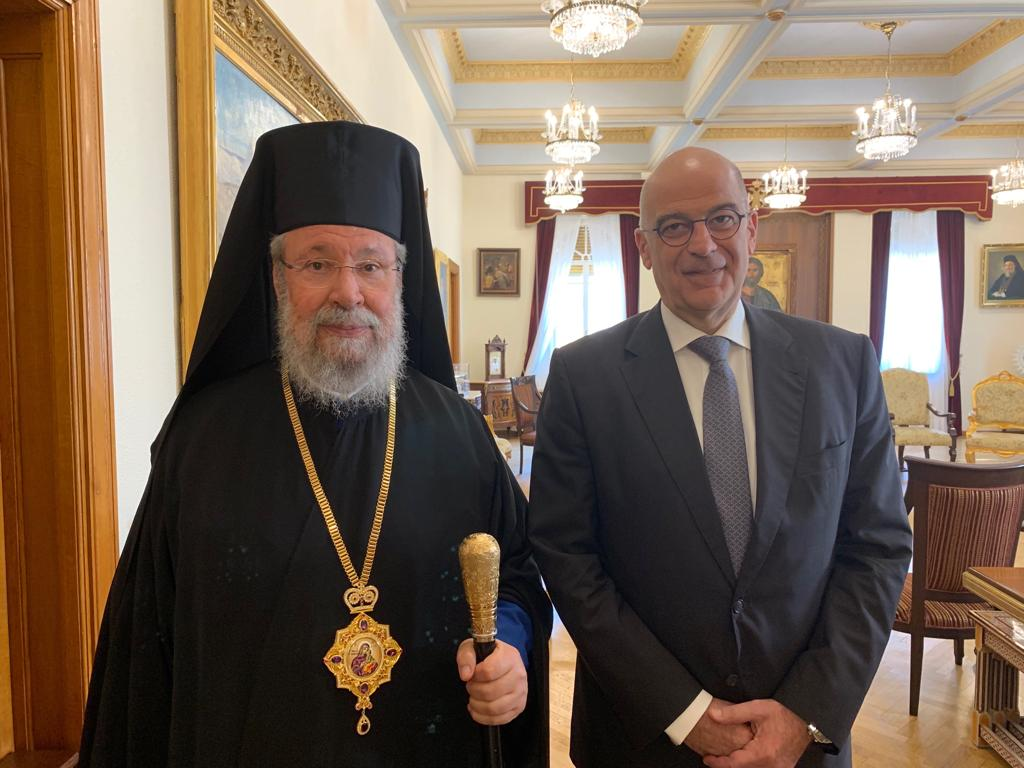
Chrysostomos II with former Greek Minister for Foreign Affairs Nikos Dendias.

Chrysostomos II was known for his social conservatism. He had, in a television interview, admitted that he supported the causes of Cyprus' National People's Front (ELAM), anti-Turkish Cypriot party. He stated that his support to ELAM included, but was not limited to the issues of immigration. This statement came months before a legislative election and after ELAM attacks on Turkish Cypriots and civilians they perceived as foreign, resulting in accusations of political interference by Cyprus Mail. He further called ELAM members "educated persons who are sincerely interested in their country". This approach of Chrysostomos II has contributed to the legitimization of far-right views in society. Furthermore, he expressed his satisfaction after ELAM entered the Cypriot parliament in the 2016 legislative election. He has opposed illegal immigration into Cyprus, branding illegal immigrants as 'interlopers who do not belong on the island'. In another remark, he said "I would even back a black man, if we had the same views"; this remark was criticised by Operation Black Vote as blatant racism.

In 2014 he called for politicians to condemn homosexuality and claimed governments demonstrated 'weakening moral integrity' by introducing civil partnerships and same-sex marriage. His comments were attacked by Cypriot MEP Andreas Pitsillides as 'racist and homophobic' and stated 'I emphatically stress these are clearly against the spirit of the Gospel of love of Christ and certainly violate all European and international treaties protecting human rights against any form of discrimination based on race, gender, religion and sexual orientation'. Another MEP, Ulrike Lunacek, claimed the Orthodox Church was 'detached from reality'. In 2016, he announced church plans to establish schools that would teach children that homosexuality is unnatural, a sin and should be overcome through struggle. He further said that the schools were aimed at giving children "principles" and raising "proper people". These remarks were met with the anger of LGBT rights organizations.

Chrysostomos II was received in a historic private audience with Pope Benedict XVI in the Vatican, on 16 June 2007. Their discussions involved the safety of Christians in the Middle East as a result of an ongoing political tension between warring countries. They had another meeting on 28 March 2011.

On 20 March 2013, it was reported that Chrysostomos II said he would put the Cyprus Orthodox Church's assets at the country's disposal to help pull the country out of its financial crisis. He said the church was willing to mortgage its assets to invest in government bonds.

On 12 July 2020, The primate of the Church of Cyprus, Archbishop Chrysostomos II expressed his opinions regarding the reversion of the Hagia Sophia museum to a mosque stating that "The Turks have remained uncivilized, they are rude, and they will remain [this way]." He added that "Turkey has learned to destroy, it has learned to appropriate the cultures of others and sometimes, when it does not benefit it, it destroys them and falsely presents cultures as its own."

== Scandals ==
It was reported that Chrysostomos II was instrumental in Malaysian conman and fugitive, Jho Low, being granted Cypriot citizenship. Chrysostomos II reportedly had sent at least two letters to then Minister of Interior, Sokratis Hasikos, asking for Low to be granted citizenship. The Archbishop received a donation of €300,000 from Jho Low on the same day that Jho Low received his passport. At the time, Jho Low was already under investigation and investigators were closing in on him for his alleged money-laundering activities. He was granted a passport despite the fact that a background check on him raised several red flags because of his status as a politically exposed person as well as his alleged fraud and regulatory breaches.

== Death ==
Archbishop Chrysostomos II died from liver cancer on 7 November 2022, at the age of 81. After his death, he was replaced by George of Paphos as locum tenens of the Church of Cyprus and the 2022 Cypriot archiepiscopal election was called to choose his successor. On 24 December 2022, George of Paphos was elected as his successor.

== See also ==
- List of archbishops of Cyprus

Religious titles
Preceded by Chrysostomos I	Archbishop of Cyprus; 2006–2022	Succeeded by George III
