= List of kidnappings (1970–1979) =

The following is a list of kidnappings that occurred between 1970 and 1979, summarizing the events of each case, including instances of celebrity abductions, claimed hoaxes, suspected kidnappings, extradition abductions, and mass kidnappings.

== 1970 ==
| Date | Image | Victim(s) | Abductor(s) | Location | Age of victim(s) | Outcome | Notes |
|---|---|---|---|---|---|---|---|
| 22 March 1970 | | Kathleen Johns | Zodiac Killer | (United States) Patterson, California, US | 22 | Escaped | Kathleen Johns, who was seven months pregnant, and her ten-month-old daughter were picked up by an unidentified man who offered Johns a lift to a nearby gas station. The man then drove them around for two hours before telling Johns he was going to kill her and throw her baby out the window. Johns managed to jump out of the car with her daughter and ran until she was able to flag down a passing farmer who took them to the police. Johns later identified a sketch of the Zodiac Killer, who also confessed to the abduction in a letter. |
| 22 March 1970 | | Jennifer Johns | Zodiac Killer | (United States) Patterson, California, US | 10 months | Escaped | |
| 7 April 1970 | | César Montenegro Paniagua | La Mann rebels | Guatemala | 50 | Murdered | Guatemalan politician and ardent communist. He was kidnapped, tortured and murdered in reprisal for the murder of West German politician Karl von Spreti. |
| 29 May 1970 | | Pedro Eugenio Aramburu | Montoneros | Buenos Aires, Argentina | 67 | Murdered | See Assassination of Pedro Eugenio Aramburu Aramburu, former de facto President of Argentina between 1955 and 1958, was kidnapped by members of Montoneros seeking to avenge the execution of General Juan José Valle and the kidnapping of Eva Perón's body. |
| 7 August 1970 | | Harold Haley | Jonathan P. Jackson, James McClain, Ruchell Magee, William Christmas | (United States) San Rafael, California, US | 64 | Murdered | Victims of the Marin County Civic Center attack, during which four Black Power activists led by Jonathan Jackson overpowered the guards at the trial of Black Panther James McClain and took Judge Harold Haley, Deputy District Attorney Gary Thomas, and three jurors hostage in order to demand the release of the Soledad Brothers, who included Jackson's brother George. Jackson, McClain, and two of McClain's fellow prisoners, Ruchell Magee and William Christmas, then tried to escape with the hostages in a van and were fired at by court officers; during the shootout, Judge Haley was shot in the chest by William Christmas and then killed by a blast from a shotgun held to his neck by Magee. The shootout ultimately led to the deaths of Jackson, McClain, and Christmas, the wounding and arrest of Magee, and the recovery of the four surviving hostages. |
| 7 August 1970 | | Gary W. Thomas | Jonathan P. Jackson, James McClain, Ruchell Magee, William Christmas | (United States) San Rafael, California, US | 32 | Rescued | |
| 7 August 1970 | | Maria Graham | Jonathan P. Jackson, James McClain, Ruchell Magee, William Christmas | (United States) San Rafael, California, US | Unknown | Rescued | |
| 7 August 1970 | | Doris Whitmer | Jonathan P. Jackson, James McClain, Ruchell Magee, William Christmas | (United States) San Rafael, California, US | Unknown | Rescued | |
| 7 August 1970 | | Joyce Rodoni | Jonathan P. Jackson, James McClain, Ruchell Magee, William Christmas | (United States) San Rafael, California, US | Unknown | Rescued | |
| 13 September 1970 | | Monica Schiller | Terrance Haley, Raymond Gunning and Andrew Brooks | Murbko, South Australia | 21 | Rescued | Three "trustees" at the Cadell Training Centre absconded from a work release detail, entered the Schiller farm, and tied up Monica's family and boyfriend. After taking food, water, guns, and ammunition, they left with the 21-year-old. The escapees first drove to the Adelaide suburb of Semaphore, then took another stolen vehicle with the intention to going to Darwin via the Birdsville Track. Police chartered a light plane and arrived at Birdsville before the kidnappers. Setting up a roadblock south of the town, police were able to stop the vehicle. After firing a number of shots at the abductors, they were captured and arrested. Monica was found alive in the vehicle, traumatised by the events of the 26 hour ordeal. |
| 17 September 1970 | | Kelly Lynn Albright | Unknown | (United States) Hutchinson, Kansas, US | 12 | Murdered | Kelly Albright had been sleeping in her bed with her two siblings in the home of her mother and stepfather, Roberta and Richard LeShure, when she woke her brother upon leaving the bedroom, after which she vanished from the home. She was found in a field three days later, having been sexually assaulted and stabbed multiple times. Little additional evidence was recovered outside of a pillow slip and her pajamas. The prime suspect in the case died before he could be questioned thoroughly, and the case remains unsolved. The crime served as the basis for a mystery novel, Facing September, by Sara Jenlink. |
| 25 September 1970 – 8 August 1973 | | Houston child murders | Dean Corll, Elmer Wayne Henley, David Owen Brooks | (United States) Houston, Texas, US | 13-20 | Murdered | Between September 1970 and August 1973, at least 28 teenage boys were abducted in or near Houston, Texas by serial killer Dean Corll. The victims were typically lured with promises of a party or a lift before being restrained to Corll's torture board, sexually abused, tortured and either shot or strangled to death. Many of the abductions were carried out by Corll's teenage accomplices Elmer Wayne Henley and David Brooks. The murders eventually came to an end on 8 August 1973 when Henley abducted the intended 29th and 30th victims - Timothy Kerley, 19, and Rhonda Williams, 15 - at which point Corll attempted to force Henley to kill Williams himself as punishment for bringing him a girl. Henley instead shot Corll dead and turned himself in to the police. It is suspected that up to 42 missing teenagers may have been victims of the Houston mass murders. |
| 25 September 1970 – 8 August 1973 | | Timothy Kerley | Dean Corll, Elmer Wayne Henley, David Owen Brooks | (United States) Houston, Texas, US | 19 | Released | |
| 25 September 1970 – 8 August 1973 | | Rhonda Williams | Dean Corll, Elmer Wayne Henley, David Owen Brooks | (United States) Houston, Texas, US | 15 | Released | |
| 5 October 1970 | | James Cross | Front de libération du Québec militants | Quebec, Canada | 49 | Released | Cross, an Irish-born British diplomat, and Laporte, a Quebec provincial politician, were both kidnapped by the FLQ. Their kidnappings set off the 1970 October Crisis. Cross was released in exchange for passage of his abductors to Cuba. |
| 10 October 1970 | | Pierre Laporte | Front de libération du Québec militants | Quebec, Canada | 49 | Murdered | Cross, an Irish-born British diplomat, and Laporte, a Quebec provincial politician, were both kidnapped by the FLQ. Their kidnappings set off the 1970 October Crisis. Cross was released in exchange for passage of his abductors to Cuba. |
| 23 November 1970 | | Ertuğrul Dursun Önkuzu | Communist students | Ankara, Turkey | 22 | Murdered | Önkuzu, an Idealist student at a university in Ankara, was kidnapped by a group of six communist students who targeted him due to his political views. He was tortured for three days until 23 November, when his kidnappers used a bicycle pump to inflate his lungs until they burst before throwing him out of a window to his death. |

== 1971 ==
| Date | Image | Victim(s) | Abductor(s) | Location | Age of victim(s) | Outcome | Notes |
|---|---|---|---|---|---|---|---|
| 1971 | | Two unnamed girls | Robert Hohenberger | (United States) Laguna Beach, California, US | Unknown | Released | Two unnamed girls were kidnapped and held at gunpoint by Robert Hohenberger in Laguna Beach. Hohenberger was later charged and convicted for this and sent to jail for a short time. |
| 13 June 1971 | | Unnamed 16-year-old girl | Robledo Puch and Jorge Antonio Ibáñez | Buenos Aires, Argentina | 16 | Murdered | A 16-year-old girl was kidnapped on a Buenos Aires highway and murdered. |
| 24 June 1971 | | Unnamed 22-year-old woman | Robledo Puch and Jorge Antonio Ibáñez | Buenos Aires, Argentina | 22 | Murdered | A 22-year-old woman was kidnapped and murdered. |
| 27 July 1971 | | Brenda Crockett | Unknown | (United States) Northwest, Washington, D.C. US | 10 | Murdered | Brenda Crockett from Northwest, Washington, D.C. did not arrive home on 27 July 1971, but she had called to say she would be arriving home as some man had her in his possession. She was found dead the next day after being murdered on U.S. Route 50, close to the Baltimore-Washington Parkway in Prince George's County, Maryland by a hitchhiker early in the morning. |
| 10 September 1971 | | Lynn Eusan | Unknown | (United States) Houston, Texas, US | 22 | Murdered | Lynn Eusan was an African-American University of Houston student and activist who became the first black Homecoming queen in the Southern United States. She was last seen alive waiting at a bus stop, and was later found deceased in a stranger's car. The man, Leo Jackson Jr., claimed that she had stabbed herself. He was charged, but later acquitted of her murder, and Eusan's case remains unsolved. |
| 1 October 1971 | | Nenomoshia Yates | Unknown | (United States) Pennsylvania, US | 12 | Murdered | Nenomoshia Yates, an American girl from Pennsylvania on 1 October 1971 was kidnapped, strangled, and raped after leaving a Safeway store in the evening. Yates was found dead just three hours later in Prince George's County, Maryland. |
| 13 November 1971 | | Helen Betty Osborne | Dwayne Archie Johnston, James Robert Paul Houghton, Lee Scott Colgan and Norman Bernard Manger | The Pas, Manitoba, Canada | 19 | Murdered | Helen Betty Osborne, a Cree Indigenous woman from Norway House reserve was kidnapped and murdered while walking down Third Street in The Pas, Manitoba. |
| 15 November 1971 | | Brenda Denise Woodard | Unknown | (United States) Baltimore, US | 18 | Murdered | Brenda Denise Woodard was an American girl from Baltimore who left her classmate's house after having dinner with her on 15 November 1971. She was discovered just six hours later by the police after having been kidnapped and murdered. Her unknown killer had left a note in her coat pocket. |
| 15 November 1971 | | Debbie Catherine Ackerman | Unknown | (United States) Galveston, Texas, US | 15 | Murdered | Debbie Catherine Ackerman and Maria Talbot Johnson, both aged 15, were last seen attempting to hitchhike to Houston, Texas near an island ice cream shop in Galveston, Texas on 15 November 1971. Witnesses reported seeing a man in a white van stopping by the curbside and picking up the girls after agreeing to drive them to Houston. Two days later, the bodies of Ackerman and Johnson were found bound and partially nude in Turner's Bayou near Texas City. |
| 15 November 1971 | | Maria Talbot Johnson | Unknown | (United States) Galveston, Texas, US | 15 | Murdered | Debbie Catherine Ackerman and Maria Talbot Johnson, both aged 15, were last seen attempting to hitchhike to Houston, Texas near an island ice cream shop in Galveston, Texas on 15 November 1971. Witnesses reported seeing a man in a white van stopping by the curbside and picking up the girls after agreeing to drive them to Houston. Two days later, the bodies of Ackerman and Johnson were found bound and partially nude in Turner's Bayou near Texas City. |
| 16 November 1971 | | Carmen Colón | Alphabet killer | (United States) Rochester, New York, US | 10 | Murdered | Carmen Colón was a 10-year-old Puerto Rican child who disappeared on 16 November 1971 from Rochester, New York after being kidnapped, and was found dead two days later near the village of Churchville. |
| 21 November 1971 | | Edeltraud van Boxel | Münsterland Killer | Münster, West Germany | 23 | Murdered | Edeltraud van Boxel was a female German street sex worker from Münster who was seen getting into a car on 21 November 1971 at 8:30pm, before being found dead by a farmer on a dirt road at 11:40pm. |

== 1972 ==
| Date | Image | Victim(s) | Abductor(s) | Location | Age of victim(s) | Outcome | Notes |
|---|---|---|---|---|---|---|---|
| 1972–1985 | | "The Disappeared" | IRA and INLA | Northern Ireland | Various | Murdered | Seamus Wright, Kevin McKee, Jean McConville, Joseph Lynskey, Peter Wilson, Eamon Molloy, Columba McVeigh, Brendan Megraw, John McClory, Brian McKinney, Danny McIlhone, Gerard Evans, Charlie Armstrong and Seamus Ruddy were a group of both civilians and Irish republican volunteers who were kidnapped, possibly tortured, and murdered by the IRA and INLA during Northern Ireland's "Troubles" for being alleged spies, informants, thieves, etc. Their bodies were not recovered until eight of the corpses or remains were eventually located and returned to their families for burial. Another man who disappeared during this time was Robert Nairac, a British SAS officer whose identity was uncovered. |
| 3 January 1972 – 11 December 1978 | | Victims of John Wayne Gacy | John Wayne Gacy | (United States) Norwood Park Township, Illinois, U.S. | 14–21 | Murdered | At least 33 teenage boys, starting with Timothy McCoy in January 1972 and ending with Robert Piest in December 1978, were abducted, raped and murdered by John Wayne Gacy (possibly with assistance from some of his employees). Most were buried under Gacy's home in Norwood Park Township. Only 28 victims were identified. |
| 7 May 1972 | | Mary Ann Pesce | Edmund Kemper | (United States) Berkeley, California, U.S. | 18 | Murdered | Two hitchhikers who were kidnapped and murdered by serial killer Edmund Kemper. |
| 7 May 1972 | | Anita Luchessa | Edmund Kemper | (United States) Berkeley, California, U.S. | 18 | Murdered | Two hitchhikers who were kidnapped and murdered by serial killer Edmund Kemper. |
| 22 June 1972 | | Martha Mitchell | Committee for the Re-Election of the President | (United States) Newport Beach, California, U.S. | 53 | Released | Mitchell, the wife of U.S. Attorney General John N. Mitchell, was held captive for a week by agents of the Committee for the Re-Election of the President (CRP) to prevent her from talking to the media about her husband's role in the Watergate scandal. She was released after being tracked down by reporters from the New York Daily News, and CRP member James W. McCord Jr. later admitted that Mitchell had been "basically kidnapped". |
| 15 July 1972 | | Felix John Hughes | Robert John Kerr | Portadown, Northern Ireland | 35 | Murdered | Felix J. Hughes was a Catholic welder who was abducted by members of the Ulster Defence Association, most notably Robert John Kerr. They took him to the nearby townland of Edenderry and shot him dead; they then tied his body to a mattress which was weighed down with stones and dumped it in a drainage ditch off Watson's Street. Hughes body would be discovered by British Army frogmen on August 4. |
| 5 September 1972 | | Diane Denise Williams | Unknown | (United States) Washington, D.C., U.S. | 17 | Murdered | Diane Denise Williams was a Ballou High School student who after being sighted boarding a bus on 5 September 1972 was found dead just a few hours later after being disposed of alongside I-295, which is south of the District line. |
| 5 September 1972 | | 9 Israeli athletes | Black September Organization | Munich, West Germany | 18-53 | Murdered | The victims were taken hostage at the Olympic Village on 5 September during the Munich massacre. They were murdered in the early hours of 6 September during a failed rescue attempt at Fürstenfeldbruck airbase. |
| 14 September 1972 | | Aiko Koo | Edmund Kemper | (United States) Santa Cruz County, California, U.S. | 15 | Murdered | Koo was kidnapped and murdered by serial killer Edmund Kemper. |
| 15 September 1972 | | Pamela Gail Milam | Jeffrey Lynn Hand | (United States) Vigo County, Indiana, U.S. | 19 | Murdered | Milam was a 19-year-old Indiana State University student who disappeared after attending a sorority membership selection meeting on 15 September 1972; her strangled body was found in the trunk of her own vehicle one day after. Han, who had died in 1978, was identified as her murderer in 2019. |
| 3 October 1972 | | Wally Jay Simoneaux | Dean Corll | (United States) Houston, Texas, U.S. | 14 | Murdered | Two school friends abducted and murdered by serial killer Dean Corll and his teenage accomplices. Their bodies were recovered from Corll's boat shed on 8 August 1973. |
| 3 October 1972 | | Richard Edward Hembree | Dean Corll | (United States) Houston, Texas, U.S. | 13 | Murdered | Two school friends abducted and murdered by serial killer Dean Corll and his teenage accomplices. Their bodies were recovered from Corll's boat shed on 8 August 1973. |
| 4 December 1972 | | Steven Stayner | Kenneth Parnell and Ervin Edward Murphy | (United States) Merced, California, U.S. | 7 | Escaped | Stayner was kidnapped on his way home from school. He was raised as Parnell's son for seven years until Parnell abducted another child, Timmy White, in 1980. The two boys escaped on 1 March 1980. At the time of Steven's return, it was the longest known kidnapping in America that ended in a safe return. |
| 28 December 1972 | | Pinhas Lavie | Black September Organization militants | Bangkok, Thailand | 37 | Released | Israeli diplomat who served as the ambassador to Eswatini and the Dominican Republic and was abducted by Palestinian militants during the Israeli Bangkok Embassy hostage crisis. After 19 hours, Lavie and the other hostages were released from captivity in Egypt. |

== 1973 ==
| Date | Image | Victim(s) | Abductor(s) | Location | Age of victim(s) | Outcome | Notes |
|---|---|---|---|---|---|---|---|
| 7 January 1973 | | Cindy Schall | Edmund Kemper | (United States) Cabrillo College, Aptos, California, U.S. | 18 | Murdered | Schall was kidnapped and murdered by serial killer Edmund Kemper. Her body was dismembered and was thrown off a cliff into the Pacific Ocean. |
| 11 January 1973 | | Paul Martin Andrews | Richard Ausley | (United States) Portsmouth, Virginia, U.S. | 13 | Rescued | 13-year-old Andrews was abducted by child molester Richard Ausley, who imprisoned him in a box under the ground and raped him repeatedly. He was rescued by hunters after eight days in captivity. Ausley was sentenced to 48 years in prison. Andrews' activism against Ausley's release contributed to the passage of Virginia's Civil Commitment for Sexually Violent Predators Act. Ausley was murdered in prison in 2004. |
| 27 January 1973 | | Dawn Lee Swan Magyar | Jerald Wingeart | (United States) Owosso, Michigan, U.S. | 20 | Murdered | Magyar was abducted while grocery shopping. Her body was later found. She was raped and shot multiple times and her murder remained unsolved until 2001. |
| 30–31 January 1973 | | Philip Rafferty | Ulster Defence Association | Belfast, Northern Ireland | 14 | Murdered | Rafferty was abducted while on his way to band practice in Andersonstown; he was taken to a parking lot near Giant's Ring and shot. |
| 30–31 January 1973 | | Gabriel Savage | Ulster Defence Association | Belfast, Northern Ireland | 17 | Murdered | Savage was a motor mechanic who was abducted while out shopping with his girlfriend in Andersonstown; he was then shot and his body dumped on a grass verge on the M1 Motorway. |
| 5 February 1973 | | Rosalind Heather Thorpe | Edmund Kemper | (United States) Santa Cruz, California, U.S. | 23 | Murdered | Two UCSC students abducted and shot to death by serial killer Edmund Kemper. Their bodies were mutilated and discarded in various locations over the following days, with their head and hands thrown down a cliff known locally as Devil's Slide. |
| 5 February 1973 | | Alice Helen Liu | Edmund Kemper | (United States) Santa Cruz, California, U.S. | 20 | Murdered | Two UCSC students abducted and shot to death by serial killer Edmund Kemper. Their bodies were mutilated and discarded in various locations over the following days, with their head and hands thrown down a cliff known locally as Devil's Slide. |
| February 1973 | | Anton Foek | Chilean government agents | Chile | 30 | Released | Surinamese-born Dutch freelance journalist who was kidnapped and tortured by agents of the Chilean government when Augusto Pinochet came to power, and was later released and kicked out of the country. |
| 3 February 1973 | | Joseph Allen Lyles | Elmer Wayne Henley | (United States) Houston, Texas, U.S. | 17 | Murdered | A teenage boy who was abducted and killed by serial killer Elmer Wayne Henley. |
| 9 March 1973 | | Franca Rame | Unknown | Milan, Italy | 43 | Released | An Italian theatre actress, playwright and political activist. Rame was abducted at gunpoint and raped by five individuals allegedly commissioned by high-ranking officials in Milan's Carabinieri. She was released after several hours of abuse and captivity. |
| 2 April 1973 | | Wanda Walkowicz | Alphabet killer | (United States) Rochester, New York, U.S. | 11 | Murdered | The second known victim of the Alphabet murders. Walkowicz disappeared while returning home from an errand; her body was discovered at the base of a hillside alongside an access road to State Route 104 in Webster the following day. She had been sexually assaulted, then strangled from behind with a ligature. |
| 9 June 1973 | | Jason Shannon | Barry Shannon | Adelaide, Australia | 11 months | Unknown | A baby was abducted by his father, who was killed in a car crash two hours later. He has never been found. |
| 16 June 1973 | | Jeffery Wayne Thomas | Jeffrey Lynn Hand | (United States) Indiana, U.S. | 22 | Murdered | An interracial couple abducted by suspected serial killer Jeffrey Lynn Hand. The Thomases were kidnapped, ostensibly for ransom. Jeffery was later shot to death by Hand; his wife escaped. |
| 16 June 1973 | | Carol Thomas | Jeffrey Lynn Hand | (United States) Indiana, U.S. | 22 | Escaped | An interracial couple abducted by suspected serial killer Jeffrey Lynn Hand. The Thomases were kidnapped, ostensibly for ransom. Jeffery was later shot to death by Hand; his wife escaped. |
| 16–17 June 1973 | | Daniel Rouse | Ulster Defence Association | Belfast, Northern Ireland, U.K. | 17 | Murdered | Rouse was abducted while he was walking along Finaghy Road North near his home on 16 June, before being taken to a waste ground and shot twice in the head. Rouse was murdered in retaliation for the 1973 Coleraine bombings. |
| 16–17 June 1973 | | Joseph Kelly | Ulster Defence Association | Larne, Northern Ireland, U.K. | 25 | Murdered | Kelly, a former UDR soldier and alleged IRA member, who was abducted on 17 June, while on his way to Larne; he was then shot twice in the head and once in the back, and his body was dumped near the Corr's Corner Hotel. Kelly was murdered in an attempt to cover up the assassination of Michael Wilson, the brother-in-law of Tommy Herron. |
| 10 July 1973 | | John Paul Getty III | 'Ndrangheta | Rome, Italy | 18 | Released | Getty was kidnapped by members of 'Ndrangheta, an Italian crime syndicate, who demanded a ransom from his grandfather J. Paul Getty, an American oil tycoon and one of the richest men in the world at the time. The kidnappers cut off his ear and sent it to the newspapers as a threat. Getty was released in December after the ransom was paid. |
| 26 July 1973 | | Janice Pockett | Unknown | (United States) Tolland, Connecticut, U.S. | 7 | Unknown | Janice asked her mother if she could ride off by herself. It was the first time she had been allowed to go anywhere by herself. She never returned. Her bike was found less than a mile away from her home, abandoned on a dirt road close to the woods. There were hundreds of names of possible suspects, but no corroborating evidence to substantiate them as suspects. The case has been re-opened many times and is still an open case as of 2018. The Discovery Network featured her story in Dark Minds and a Facebook page is dedicated to finding her. |
| 8 August 1973 | | Kim Dae-jung | Members of the Korean Central Intelligence Agency (KCIA) | Tokyo, Japan | 49 | Released | After attending a meeting with the leader of the Democratic Unification Party in the Grand Hotel Palace in Tokyo, the future President of South Korea was abducted by a group of unidentified men as he walked out of the room. He was taken into another room where he was drugged unconscious. The kidnappers intended to throw Kim into the sea and drown him while boarding a boat from Osaka to Seoul, but this was abandoned when the Japanese Navy made pursuit of the kidnappers' boat. Kim was released back in Seoul five days after the kidnapping. |
| October 1973 | | Bobi Sourander | Chilean Armed Forces | Santiago, Chile | 45 | Released | Finnish-Swedish journalist for Dagens Nyheter who was imprisoned for two weeks after the 1973 Chilean coup d'état. He was later released without incident, but subsequently expelled from the country. |
| 20 October 1973 | | Richard Hague | Death Angels | (United States) San Francisco, California, U.S. | 30 | Survived | A white couple who were abducted by a group of black serial killers known as the "Death Angels". Quita was later found decapitated near a railroad track. Richard was found nearby, bound and covered in knife wounds but alive. |
| 20 October 1973 | | Quita Hague | Death Angels | (United States) San Francisco, California, U.S. | 28 | Murdered | A white couple who were abducted by a group of black serial killers known as the "Death Angels". Quita was later found decapitated near a railroad track. Richard was found nearby, bound and covered in knife wounds but alive. |
| 17 November 1973 | | Roger Essem | Allen Fryer, David Fryer, James Fryer | (United States) Gitchie Manitou State Preserve, Iowa, U.S. | 18 | Murdered | Five teenagers ambushed within a nature preserve in Lyon County, Iowa. Four of the teenagers—all male—were murdered; the fifth teenager, Sandra Cheskey, was sexually assaulted, then released. The perpetrators—brothers David, Allen and James Fryer—were later convicted of the crimes and sentenced to life imprisonment. |
| 17 November 1973 | | Stewart Baade | Allen Fryer, David Fryer, James Fryer | (United States) Gitchie Manitou State Preserve, Iowa, U.S. | 18 | Murdered | Five teenagers ambushed within a nature preserve in Lyon County, Iowa. Four of the teenagers—all male—were murdered; the fifth teenager, Sandra Cheskey, was sexually assaulted, then released. The perpetrators—brothers David, Allen and James Fryer—were later convicted of the crimes and sentenced to life imprisonment. |
| 17 November 1973 | | Michael Hadrath | Allen Fryer, David Fryer, James Fryer | (United States) Gitchie Manitou State Preserve, Iowa, U.S. | 15 | Murdered | Five teenagers ambushed within a nature preserve in Lyon County, Iowa. Four of the teenagers—all male—were murdered; the fifth teenager, Sandra Cheskey, was sexually assaulted, then released. The perpetrators—brothers David, Allen and James Fryer—were later convicted of the crimes and sentenced to life imprisonment. |
| 17 November 1973 | | Dana Baade | Allen Fryer, David Fryer, James Fryer | (United States) Gitchie Manitou State Preserve, Iowa, U.S. | 14 | Murdered | Five teenagers ambushed within a nature preserve in Lyon County, Iowa. Four of the teenagers—all male—were murdered; the fifth teenager, Sandra Cheskey, was sexually assaulted, then released. The perpetrators—brothers David, Allen and James Fryer—were later convicted of the crimes and sentenced to life imprisonment. |
| 17 November 1973 | | Sandra Cheskey | Allen Fryer, David Fryer, James Fryer | (United States) Gitchie Manitou State Preserve, Iowa, U.S. | 13 | Released | Five teenagers ambushed within a nature preserve in Lyon County, Iowa. Four of the teenagers—all male—were murdered; the fifth teenager, Sandra Cheskey, was sexually assaulted, then released. The perpetrators—brothers David, Allen and James Fryer—were later convicted of the crimes and sentenced to life imprisonment. |
| 26 November 1973 | | Michelle Maenza | Alphabet killer | (United States) Rochester, New York, U.S. | 11 | Murdered | The final known victim of the Alphabet murders. Maenza disappeared while walking across a shopping plaza close to her school to retrieve a purse her mother had left inside a store within the plaza earlier that day. Her strangled body was found in a ditch in Macedon two days later. |
| 27 December 1973 | | Thomas Niedermayer | Provisional IRA | Belfast, Northern Ireland | 45 | Murdered | Niedermayer was a German national and the manager of a Grundig factory in County Antrim, Northern Ireland. He died shortly after being abducted by the IRA from his home in Belfast. His remains were eventually found, buried in an embankment near Belfast, on 11 March 1980. |

== 1974 ==
| Date | Image | Victim(s) | Abductor(s) | Location | Age of victim(s) | Outcome | Notes |
|---|---|---|---|---|---|---|---|
| 1974 | | Suzanne Marie Sevakis | Franklin Delano Floyd | (United States) North Carolina, U.S. | 5 | Raised by abductor, later killed | Suzanne Sevakis, going by the name of Tonya Hughes, was killed in an apparent hit-and-run in 1990. It was discovered following her death that her husband, who was much older, actually raised Hughes from an early age. DNA testing determined they were not biological relatives. Floyd gave inconsistent stories regarding how she came to be in his custody. Floyd is the prime suspect in Hughes's death. Sevakis' true identity remained a mystery until 2014, when DNA testing confirmed that Sharon Marshall was Suzanne Marie Sevakis. Floyd was married to Sevakis' mother when she was sentenced to 30 days in jail for a minor crime. He was left to care for her four children while she was incarcerated. After she was released, she found that the children and Floyd had disappeared. She found two children in the care of the local social services where he left them, but Suzanne and her younger brother were never found and the boy's fate remained unknown until 2019, when a man came forward believing he was the boy, which was confirmed by DNA testing in 2020. The mother attempted to file kidnapping charges but the local police declined, telling her that the child's stepfather had parental rights over the children. |
| 1974 | | Argentino del Valle Larrabure | People's Revolutionary Army | Villa María, Argentina | 43 | Murdered | Argentine military officer who was captured by People's Revolutionary Army members during an assault. He was held in detention for 372 days, until he died in unclear circumstances. |
| 16 January 1974 | | Barbara McCulkin | Garry Dubois, Vincent O'Dempsey | Brisbane, Australia | 34 | Murdered | Barbara McCulkin and her two daughters were abducted by criminals Dubois and O'Dempsey, who wanted to stop her from talking to police about their role in nightclub bombings. Their bodies were never found, but O'Dempsey later boasted of having raped and strangled them with help from Dubois. The two were eventually found guilty of the murders in 2017. |
| 16 January 1974 | | Leanne McCulkin | Garry Dubois, Vincent O'Dempsey | Brisbane, Australia | 11 | Murdered | Barbara McCulkin and her two daughters were abducted by criminals Dubois and O'Dempsey, who wanted to stop her from talking to police about their role in nightclub bombings. Their bodies were never found, but O'Dempsey later boasted of having raped and strangled them with help from Dubois. The two were eventually found guilty of the murders in 2017. |
| 16 January 1974 | | Vicki McCulkin | Garry Dubois, Vincent O'Dempsey | Brisbane, Australia | 13 | Murdered | Barbara McCulkin and her two daughters were abducted by criminals Dubois and O'Dempsey, who wanted to stop her from talking to police about their role in nightclub bombings. Their bodies were never found, but O'Dempsey later boasted of having raped and strangled them with help from Dubois. The two were eventually found guilty of the murders in 2017. |
| 4 February 1974 | | Patty Hearst | Symbionese Liberation Army | (United States) Berkeley, California, U.S. | 19 | Stayed with abductors until arrested | Hearst, an heiress to the Hearst Corporation mass media fortune, was kidnapped from her apartment by a left-wing guerilla group. She announced her allegiance to the group in April 1974, and on 15 April 1974 took part in a bank robbery. She is thought to have been a victim of Stockholm syndrome. Captured by the FBI in September 1975, Hearst was sentenced to 35 years in prison for bank robbery. She served 22 months and was released from prison on 1 February 1979. President Bill Clinton granted her a full pardon on 20 January 2001. |
| 20 February 1974 | | J. Reginald Murphy | William A. H. Williams | (United States) Atlanta, Georgia, U.S. | 41 | Released | American publisher and business executive who was kidnapped and held for $700,000 ransom. After it was paid two days later, Murphy was released and his kidnapper was arrested, but a motive for the crime was never established. |
| 24 March 1974 | | Janet Ann Taylor | John Getreu | (United States) California, U.S. | 21 | Murdered | Janet Ann Taylor was a Cañada College student who was kidnapped and later found raped and strangled to death. |
| April 1974 | | Herman Dodge Benally | Jesse Howard Bender, Delray Ballinger and Matthew Clark | (United States) Farmington, New Mexico, U.S. | 34 | Murdered | Sometime in mid to early April 1974, three Navajo (Diné) men were abducted by three white teenagers, taken to Chokecherry Canyon and bludgeoned to death. The bodies of Benally and Harvey were found together, while Ignacio's was found a week later. All three teens were arrested but never served jail time, instead being sent to a reform school despite the brutality of the murders. The murders became known as the Chokecherry Canyon massacre or simply the Chokecherry massacre. |
| April 1974 | | John Earl Harvey | Jesse Howard Bender, Delray Ballinger and Matthew Clark | (United States) Farmington, New Mexico, U.S. | 39 | Murdered | Sometime in mid to early April 1974, three Navajo (Diné) men were abducted by three white teenagers, taken to Chokecherry Canyon and bludgeoned to death. The bodies of Benally and Harvey were found together, while Ignacio's was found a week later. All three teens were arrested but never served jail time, instead being sent to a reform school despite the brutality of the murders. The murders became known as the Chokecherry Canyon massacre or simply the Chokecherry massacre. |
| April 1974 | | David Ignacio | Jesse Howard Bender, Delray Ballinger and Matthew Clark | (United States) Farmington, New Mexico, U.S. | 52 | Murdered | Sometime in mid to early April 1974, three Navajo (Diné) men were abducted by three white teenagers, taken to Chokecherry Canyon and bludgeoned to death. The bodies of Benally and Harvey were found together, while Ignacio's was found a week later. All three teens were arrested but never served jail time, instead being sent to a reform school despite the brutality of the murders. The murders became known as the Chokecherry Canyon massacre or simply the Chokecherry massacre. |
| 12 April 1974 | | Richard Debois | Robert Hohenberger | (United States) Los Banos, California, U.S. | 20 | Escaped | A young married couple kidnapped and forced by prison escapee Robert Hohenberger to drive to Modesto, then Los Banos, California. While refueling their car at a gas station alongside the I-5, Debois and his wife managed to flee and report their kidnapping to authorities. |
| 12 April 1974 | | Victoria Debois | Robert Hohenberger | (United States) Los Banos, California, U.S. | 19 | Escaped | A young married couple kidnapped and forced by prison escapee Robert Hohenberger to drive to Modesto, then Los Banos, California. While refueling their car at a gas station alongside the I-5, Debois and his wife managed to flee and report their kidnapping to authorities. |
| 2 June 1974 | | Marie-Dolorès Rambla | Christian Ranucci | Marseille, France | 8 | Murdered | Ranucci lured Marie-Dolorès Rambla into his car on the pretext of helping him find his dog; his motive is unclear, as there is no evidence he tried to sexually assault her. After driving around for an hour, Ranucci crashed the car and, panicking, drove Rambla to an isolated rural area, dragged her into the underbrush and stabbed her to death. |
| 6 June 1974 | | Annette Friedland | Frank Wyatt | (United States) Gladwyne, Pennsylvania, U.S. | 44 | Released | Wife of American super market executive who was kidnapped and held for $60,000 ransom. The ransom was paid the same day and Friedland was released. |
| 3 July 1974 | | Elisabeth Bousquet | Hamida Djandoubi | Marseille, France | 21 | Murdered | Bousquet was kidnapped by Tunisian sex trafficker Hamida Djandoubi after informing on him to the police and was tortured in front of two of Djandoubi's other victims in order to frighten them into silence before being strangled. Djandoubi was beheaded for this crime, the last execution by beheading in Europe. |
| 23 July 1974 | | Ann Ogilby | Albert Graham, Elizabeth Young, Kathleen Whitla, Josephine Brown, Elizabeth Douglas and Lily Douglas | Belfast, Northern Ireland, U.K. | 32 | Murdered | Ann was a single mother of four who was abducted from a friend's house, along with her daughter Sharlene, by members of the Ulster Defence Association who brought the two to a UDA club in Sandy Row, because Ann was having an affair with Young's husband William and for defamatory comments towards Young. The next day they sentenced her to a "rompering" (which is UDA slang for torture). Ann was beaten to death by two teenage girls, Henrietta Crowan and Christine Smith. Sharlene was taken to the shops by Graham, and after Ann's torture Graham took Sharlene to a YWCA hostel and left her at the front door. |
| 23 July 1974 | | Sharlene Ogilby | Albert Graham, Elizabeth Young, Kathleen Whitla, Josephine Brown, Elizabeth Douglas and Lily Douglas | Belfast, Northern Ireland, U.K. | 6 | Released | |
| 24 July 1974 | | Patrick Kelly | Wesley Somerville and Oliver Gibson (suspected) | Trillick, Northern Ireland, UK | 33 | Murdered | Patsy Kelly, a nationalist councilor for County Omagh, was abducted after he left a pub that he was speaking at; he was shot several times and his body was dumped in Lough Erne. Kelly's body was discovered three weeks later on 10 August by local fishermen. |
| 11 September 1974 | | Víctor Olea Alegría | "security agents", Chile's secret police | Santiago, Chile | 26 | Released | Víctor Olea Alegría was a member of the Socialist Party of Chile who was captured and detained by Chile's secret police on 11 September 1974 and was later deported to a prison camp; he was later released, but was then killed. |
| 1 October 1974 | | Daria Wightman | Warren Forrest | (United States) Portland, Oregon, U.S. | 20 | Survived | Abducted, assaulted and shot multiple times with a dart gun by accused serial killer Warren Forrest. Wightman survived her injuries, and was driven to a nearby hospital by members of the public, where she was treated for her injuries. |
| 17 October 1974 | | Jan Broberg | Robert Berchtold | (United States) Pocatello, Idaho, U.S. | 12 | Rescued | Raped, brainwashed, and later kidnapped again. |
| 8 November 1974 | | Carol DaRonch | Ted Bundy | (United States) Murray, Utah, U.S. | 18 | Survived attempted kidnapping | DaRonch escaped from Bundy's car and survived after he attempted to kidnap her. |
| 12 November 1974 | | Jack Teich | Richard Warren Williams | (United States) Kings Point, New York, U.S. | 34 | Released | Teich was kidnapped in his driveway in the evening after work. His abductors demanded and received a $750,000 ransom before the police lost sight of the retrieval. Years later, two men were tried for the crime; however, only one was convicted and served time. |
| 18 November 1974 | | Eduardo Romualdez | Napoleon Lechoco | (United States) Washington, D.C., U.S. | 65 | Released | Filipino Ambassador to the United States who was held hostage at the Philippine Embassy by a gunman who demanded that his son be issued an exit visa and allowed to leave the country. After a 10-hour standoff, Romualdez was released without harm following negotiations with his abductor. |
| 29 November 1974 | | Jorge Müller | Dirección de Inteligencia Nacional | Villa Grimaldi, Chile | 27 | Unknown | Two activists from the Revolutionary Left Movement (MIR) were detained on 29 November 1974 by security police during the military dictatorship of Augusto Pinochet. Their fate remains unknown. |
| 29 November 1974 | | Carmen Bueno | Dirección de Inteligencia Nacional | Villa Grimaldi, Chile | 24 | Unknown | Two activists from the Revolutionary Left Movement (MIR) were detained on 29 November 1974 by security police during the military dictatorship of Augusto Pinochet. Their fate remains unknown. |
| 13 December 1974 | | Betty Van Patter | Unknown | (United States) San Francisco, U.S. | 45 | Murdered | Betty Van Patter was a white woman who worked as a bookkeeper for the Black Panther Party. She went missing in 1974 after allegedly threatening to expose financial improprieties within the party and was later found raped and beaten to death in the San Francisco Bay. No-one was ever charged with the crime, but it was widely believed that the Black Panther leadership ordered Van Patter's death. |

== 1975 ==
| Date | Image | Victim(s) | Abductor(s) | Location | Age of victim(s) | Outcome | Notes |
|---|---|---|---|---|---|---|---|
| 14 January 1975 | | Lesley Whittle | Donald Neilson | Highley, England | 17 | Murdered | Whittle was an heiress kidnapped from her home by Neilson, also known as the "Black Panther". Her body was found on 7 March 1975, hanging from a wire in a drain shaft in Bathpool Park, Staffordshire. Neilson was captured and convicted, and died in December 2011 while serving life in prison. |
| 27 February 1975 | | Peter Lorenz | 2 June Movement | West Berlin, West Germany | 52 | Released | Lorenz, German conservative politician and candidate for the mayor of West Berlin, was kidnapped only days before the elections. He was released unharmed after a week in exchange for five imprisoned leftist extremists, who were flown out to South Yemen. He won the majority of the votes while in captivity. |
| 25 March 1975 | | Sheila Lyon | Lloyd Lee Welch Jr. | (United States) Wheaton, Maryland, U.S. | 12 | Murdered | The Lyon sisters were at Wheaton Plaza mall, not far from their home, when they disappeared without a trace. Their brother and other people they knew had seen them eating at a restaurant in the mall, and one boy said he saw them speaking to an unknown man and talking into a recorder. Another man who would later be convicted of rape was seen paying attention to the sisters. They were never found. In 2013, a cold case team noticed a striking resemblance between a sketch in the case file and a mug shot of Welch from the late 1970s. In 2015, Welch was charged, and in September 2017 he was sentenced to 48 years in prison. |
| 25 March 1975 | | Katherine Lyon | Lloyd Lee Welch Jr. | (United States) Wheaton, Maryland, U.S. | 10 | Murdered | |
| 19 June 1975 | | Daniel Van Lone | Freddie Glenn, Michael Corbett and Larry Dunn | (United States) Colorado Springs, U.S. | 29 | Murdered | Van Lone was kidnapped outside the Four Seasons Motor Inn, where he worked as a cook, by spree killer Glenn and his accomplices Corbett and Dunn with the intention of robbery. They then drove him to an isolated road, where Corbett and Dunn made Van Lone lie on the ground before Corbett fatally shot him in the head. |
| 1 July 1975 | | Karen Grammer | Freddie Glenn, Michael Corbett, Larry Dunn and Eric McLeod | (United States) Colorado Springs, U.S. | 18 | Murdered | Glenn and his accomplices intended to rob a Red Lobster restaurant but instead kidnapped Grammer, an employee at the restaurant who was waiting for her boyfriend to finish work, out of fear she could identify them. After robbing a 7-Eleven, the men proceeded to drive Grammer to their shared apartment, where they repeatedly raped her. They then took her to South Wahsatch Avenue, where Glenn stabbed her to death. Her body was identified by her elder brother, actor Kelsey Grammer, a week later. |
| 30 July 1975 | | Jimmy Hoffa | Unknown | (United States) Bloomfield Township, Michigan, U.S. | 62 | Presumably murdered | Hoffa disappeared on Wednesday, July 30, 1975, after he had gone to a meeting with Provenzano and Giacalone.The meeting was to take place at 2:00 p.m. at the Machus Red Fox restaurant in Bloomfield Township, a Detroit suburb; it was the same place where the wedding reception of Hoffa's son James had been held.Hoffa wrote Giacalone's initials and the time and location of the meeting in his office calendar: "TG—2 p.m.—Red Fox." Before heading to the restaurant, he stopped at the Pontiac office of his close friend Louis Linteau, a former president of Teamsters Local 614 who now ran a limousine service.Between 2:15 and 2:30 p.m., an annoyed Hoffa called his wife from a payphone on a post in front of Damman Hardware, directly behind the Machus Red Fox, and complained that Giacalone had not shown up and that he had been stood up.His wife told him she had not heard from anyone. He told her he would be home in Lake Orion by 4:00 p.m. to grill steaks for dinner. Several witnesses saw Hoffa standing by his car and pacing the restaurant's parking lot. Two men saw Hoffa, recognized him, and stopped to chat with him briefly and to shake his hand.Hoffa also made a call to Linteau in which he again complained that the men were late. Linteau gave the time of his call from Hoffa as 3:30 p.m., but the FBI suspected that it must have been earlier, based on the timing of other phone calls from Linteau's office from around that time.The FBI estimated that Hoffa left the location without a struggle around 2:45–2:50 p.m. One witness reported seeing Hoffa in the back of a maroon "Lincoln or Mercury" car with three other people. |
| 21 September 1975 | | Candace Lynn Starr | Michael Singh | (United States) Gallup, New Mexico, U.S. | 16 | Murdered | Starr was abducted from her Los Angeles home by her former partner Michael Singh on 21 September 1975; she was held hostage for approximately three days before she was murdered at a convenience store in New Mexico. Starr remained unidentified until 2009, when her remains were identified via DNA analysis. |
| 3 October 1975 | | Tiede Herrema | Provisional IRA | (Republic of Ireland) Castletroy, Limerick, Ireland | 54 | Released | Dutch businessman Tiede Herrema was kidnapped by the Provisional IRA in Castletroy. He was released one month later. |
| 5 October 1975 | | Lesley Molseed | Ronald Castree | Rochdale, Manchester, England | 11 | Murdered | Lesley Molseed was abducted, raped and stabbed to death on 5 October 1975 by Ronald Castree. An intellectually disabled man named Stefan Kiszko was convicted after being coerced into confessing by the police, but his conviction was eventually overturned. Castree was identified through DNA evidence in 2006, after which he was convicted and sentenced to life imprisonment. |
| 11 December 1975 | | Anna Mae Aquash | Arlo Looking Cloud, John Graham, Theda Nelson Clarke | (United States) Denver, Colorado, U.S. | 30 | Murdered | Aquash, a member of the American Indian Movement (AIM), was abducted by fellow AIM members who had allegedly been ordered to kill her on suspicion she was a government informant. She was brought to an apartment in Rapid City, South Dakota, where she was raped by one of the kidnappers before being taken to the Rosebud Indian Reservation the following day. The kidnappers were then ordered to kill Aquash, who was driven to the Pine Ridge Indian Reservation and shot in the back of the head. |

== 1976 ==
| Date | Image | Victim(s) | Abductor(s) | Location | Age of victim(s) | Outcome | Notes |
|---|---|---|---|---|---|---|---|
| 9 January 1976 | | Michael McAllister | Richard Frederick Dixon | (United States) Casco Township, Allegan County, Michigan, U.S. | 39 | Murdered | A South Haven police officer shot to death by Richard Frederick Dixon on 9 January 1976. Dixon had been sought by the FBI for the October 1971 Eastern Airlines hijacking. He was later sentenced in Michigan state court to life in prison on the murder charge and in federal court to an additional 40 years on federal charges of air piracy and kidnapping. |
| 12 January 1976 | | Edwina Marter | Richard Gerald Jordan | (United States) Gulfport, Mississippi, U.S. | 35 | Murdered | Marter, a banker's wife, was kidnapped and murdered. Richard Gerald Jordan was executed on June 25, 2025. |
| 13 February 1976 | | Victoria Montenegro | Argentine Armed Forces | Buenos Aires, Argentina | 13 days | Rescued | Daughter of People's Revolutionary Army dissidents who was kidnapped and raised by an army colonel, while her parents were killed. A DNA test established her true identity in 2000, and the colonel was imprisoned. Since then, Montenegro has entered politics and become vice-president of the Kolina party. |
| 4 May 1976 | | Lori Smith | Virgil Presnell Jr. | (United States) Cobb County, Georgia, U.S. | 8 | Murdered | Friends Smith and Furlong were abducted by Presnell while walking home along a wooded path. Presnell sexually assaulted Furlong in his car before driving the two girls to a creek, where he drowned Smith and assaulted Furlong again. Furlong was able to escape after Presnell got a flat tire, and Presnell was arrested later that day. |
| 4 May 1976 | | Andrea Furlong | Virgil Presnell Jr. | (United States) Cobb County, Georgia, U.S. | 10 | Escaped | Friends Smith and Furlong were abducted by Presnell while walking home along a wooded path. Presnell sexually assaulted Furlong in his car before driving the two girls to a creek, where he drowned Smith and assaulted Furlong again. Furlong was able to escape after Presnell got a flat tire, and Presnell was arrested later that day. |
| 16 June 1976 | | Francis E. Meloy Jr. | Popular Front for the Liberation of Palestine (PFLP) | Green Line, Lebanon | 59 | Murdered | Meloy, the incoming U.S. Ambassador to Lebanon, Waring, his economic counselor, and their chauffeur, Zoheir Moghrabi, were taken hostage by gunmen working for the PFLP, a Palestinian militant group, after crossing the so-called "Green Line". The three of them were found shot to death later that day. |
| 16 June 1976 | | Robert O. Waring | Popular Front for the Liberation of Palestine (PFLP) | Green Line, Lebanon | 56 | Murdered | Meloy, the incoming U.S. Ambassador to Lebanon, Waring, his economic counselor, and their chauffeur, Zoheir Moghrabi, were taken hostage by gunmen working for the PFLP, a Palestinian militant group, after crossing the so-called "Green Line". The three of them were found shot to death later that day. |
| 16 June 1976 | | Zoheir Moghrabi | Popular Front for the Liberation of Palestine (PFLP) | Green Line, Lebanon | Unknown | Murdered | Meloy, the incoming U.S. Ambassador to Lebanon, Waring, his economic counselor, and their chauffeur, Zoheir Moghrabi, were taken hostage by gunmen working for the PFLP, a Palestinian militant group, after crossing the so-called "Green Line". The three of them were found shot to death later that day. |
| 15 July 1976 | | Frank Edward "Ed" Ray | Frederick Newhall Woods IV, James and Richard Schoenfeld | (United States) Chowchilla, California, U.S. | 55 | Escaped | Ray was driving the schoolchildren home from a summer class trip to the Chowchilla fairgrounds swimming pool in a schoolbus when a van blocked the road ahead of the bus. The three occupants of the van proceeded to abduct the entire bus and abandon it in the Berenda Slough, a shallow branch of the Chowchilla River, where a second van was waiting. Ray and the children were forced into the vans and were taken to a quarry in Livermore, California, where they were led into a buried truck. Ray and all of the children managed to force their way out sixteen hours after being trapped in the truck. All kidnappers were arrested within two weeks after the kidnapping. |
| 15 July 1976 | | 26 schoolchildren | Frederick Newhall Woods IV, James and Richard Schoenfeld | (United States) Chowchilla, California, U.S. | 5-14 | Escaped | |
| 10 August 1976 | | Jan Broberg | Robert Berchtold | (United States) Pocatello, Idaho, U.S. | 14 | Rescued | As a child, the actress Broberg was kidnapped on two occasions by a family friend. |
| 4 November 1976 | | Alejandro Iaccarino | Jorge Rómulo Ferranti, Bruno Trevisán | Buenos Aires Province, Argentina | 30 | Released | Argentine businessman Alejandro Iaccarino was abducted along with his two brothers and parents in the Buenos Aires Province and Santiago del Estero regions of Argentina on 4 November 1976. Iaccarino and his family were kidnapped by the military dictatorship of Argentina so their assets could be seized. While their parents were released after 17 days, Iaccarino and his brothers remained imprisoned until 4 September 1978. Jorge Rómulo Ferranti and Bruno Trevisán were both charged in connection with the abductions. |
| 4 November 1976 | | Carlos Iaccarino | Jorge Rómulo Ferranti, Bruno Trevisán | Buenos Aires Province, Argentina | 29 | Released | |
| 4 November 1976 | | Rodolfo Iaccarino | Jorge Rómulo Ferranti, Bruno Trevisán | Buenos Aires Province, Argentina | Unknown | Released | |
| 4 November 1976 | | Dora Emma Venturino | Jorge Rómulo Ferranti, Bruno Trevisán | Buenos Aires Province, Argentina | Unknown | Released | |
| 4 November 1976 | | Rodolfo Genaro Valentin Iaccarino | Jorge Rómulo Ferranti, Bruno Trevisán | Buenos Aires Province, Argentina | Unknown | Released | |
| 14 December 1976 | | Richard Oetker | Dieter Zlof | West Germany | 28 | Released | Businessman and billionaire heir who was kidnapped by a Slovene-born mechanic who kept him shackled inside a crate and gave him electrical shocks when he resisted. While Oetker was rescued 47 hours later and Zlof was sentenced to 15 years imprisonment, the incident has left him with permanent injuries to his lung. |

== 1977 ==
| Date | Image | Victim(s) | Abductor(s) | Location | Age of victim(s) | Outcome | Notes |
|---|---|---|---|---|---|---|---|
| 23 January 1977 – March 1978 | | Christine Marlot | Émile Louis | Yonne, Burgundy, France | 15 | Murdered | Seven young women who disappeared in the Yonne department between January 1977 and March 1978. Only two of their bodies were ever recovered, but prime suspect Émile Louis was convicted of all seven murders in 2004. |
| 23 January 1977 – March 1978 | | Jacqueline Weiss | Émile Louis | Yonne, Burgundy, France | 18 | Murdered | Seven young women who disappeared in the Yonne department between January 1977 and March 1978. Only two of their bodies were ever recovered, but prime suspect Émile Louis was convicted of all seven murders in 2004. |
| 23 January 1977 – March 1978 | | Chantal Gras | Émile Louis | Yonne, Burgundy, France | 18 | Murdered | Seven young women who disappeared in the Yonne department between January 1977 and March 1978. Only two of their bodies were ever recovered, but prime suspect Émile Louis was convicted of all seven murders in 2004. |
| 23 January 1977 – March 1978 | | Madeleine Dejust | Émile Louis | Yonne, Burgundy, France | 21 | Murdered | Seven young women who disappeared in the Yonne department between January 1977 and March 1978. Only two of their bodies were ever recovered, but prime suspect Émile Louis was convicted of all seven murders in 2004. |
| 23 January 1977 – March 1978 | | Martine Renault | Émile Louis | Yonne, Burgundy, France | 16 | Murdered | Seven young women who disappeared in the Yonne department between January 1977 and March 1978. Only two of their bodies were ever recovered, but prime suspect Émile Louis was convicted of all seven murders in 2004. |
| 23 January 1977 – March 1978 | | Françoise Lemoine | Émile Louis | Yonne, Burgundy, France | 27 | Murdered | Seven young women who disappeared in the Yonne department between January 1977 and March 1978. Only two of their bodies were ever recovered, but prime suspect Émile Louis was convicted of all seven murders in 2004. |
| 23 January 1977 – March 1978 | | Bernadette Lemoine | Émile Louis | Yonne, Burgundy, France | 19 | Murdered | Seven young women who disappeared in the Yonne department between January 1977 and March 1978. Only two of their bodies were ever recovered, but prime suspect Émile Louis was convicted of all seven murders in 2004. |
| 27 January 1977 | | Dagmar Hagelin | Unknown | El Palomar, Argentina | 17 | Murdered | A 17-year-old Swedish-Argentine girl who disappeared during the Dirty War on 27 January 1977. |
| 8 February 1977 | | Dick Hall | Tony Kiritsis | (United States) Indianapolis, Indiana, U.S. | | Released | Kiritsis broke into the office of his mortgage broker Dick Hall, who he was convinced was plotting to seize his property, and wired his shotgun to the back of Hall's head in such a way that the gun would go off and kill Hall if the police shot or restrained Kiritsis. Kiritsis marched Hall back to his apartment and held him hostage for 63 hours until Hall's lawyer was able to trick him into releasing Hall unharmed. Kiritsis was found not guilty by reason of insanity. |
| 12 March 1977 | | Naomi Rolon | Brian Keith Baldwin and Edward Dean Horsley | (United States) North Carolina, U.S. | 16 | Murdered | Rolon was abducted by two recent prison escapees whom she encountered while experiencing car trouble in North Carolina. She was forced into the trunk of her car and held captive for approximately forty hours, receiving non-fatal stab wounds from both men when she began screaming while captive. Rolon was murdered with a hatchet in Monroeville, Alabama on 14 March. |
| 19 May 1977 | | Colleen Stan | Cameron Hooker | (United States) Red Bluff, California, U.S. | 20 | Escaped | Stan was kidnapped by Hooker while hitchhiking. She was tortured and sexually abused over seven years until Hooker's wife, Janice, helped her escape in 1984. |
| 12 June 1977 | | Oklahoma Girl Scout murders | Unknown | (United States) Mayes County, Oklahoma, U.S. | 8–10 | Murdered | The Oklahoma Girl Scout murders is an unresolved crime that occurred at Camp Scott. The victims were three Girl Scouts, who were raped and murdered and their bodies left in the woods near their tent at summer camp. The case was classified as "solved" when Gene Leroy Hart, a local jail escapee with a history of violence, was arrested, and stood trial for the crime; he was acquitted. Thirty years later authorities conducted new DNA testing, but the results proved inconclusive, as the samples were too old. |
| 5 September 1977 | | Hanns Martin Schleyer | Brigitte Mohnhaupt and the Red Army Faction | Cologne, West Germany | 62 | Murdered | Schleyer, a German manager, was kidnapped by the extreme-left militant organisation Red Army Faction, carried out by Mohnhaupt. He was hidden in a high-rise in Erftstadt. After the imprisoned RAF members were found dead in their prison cells in Stammheim Prison, he was killed on 18 October 1977. His body was found in a car in Mulhouse, France. |
| 13 October 1977 | | Jürgen Schumann | PFLP militants | Mogadishu, Somalia | 37 | Murdered | Dillmann, a German flight attendant who later became a sculptor, and Canellas, a Spanish-German entrepreneur, were aboard Lufthansa Flight 181, piloted by fellow German Schumann, when it was hijacked by four PFLP extremists, who travelled across several countries over five days before landing in Mogadishu, Somalia. Schumann was murdered by Zohair Yousif Akache, the leader of the hijacking, on the fourth day, while the other hostages were all rescued in a joint German-Somali rescue operation. |
| 13 October 1977 | | Gabriele Dillmann | PFLP militants | Mogadishu, Somalia | 23 | Rescued | Dillmann, a German flight attendant who later became a sculptor, and Canellas, a Spanish-German entrepreneur, were aboard Lufthansa Flight 181, piloted by fellow German Schumann, when it was hijacked by four PFLP extremists, who travelled across several countries over five days before landing in Mogadishu, Somalia. Schumann was murdered by Zohair Yousif Akache, the leader of the hijacking, on the fourth day, while the other hostages were all rescued in a joint German-Somali rescue operation. |
| 13 October 1977 | | Horst-Gregorio Canellas | PFLP militants | Mogadishu, Somalia | 56 | Rescued | Dillmann, a German flight attendant who later became a sculptor, and Canellas, a Spanish-German entrepreneur, were aboard Lufthansa Flight 181, piloted by fellow German Schumann, when it was hijacked by four PFLP extremists, who travelled across several countries over five days before landing in Mogadishu, Somalia. Schumann was murdered by Zohair Yousif Akache, the leader of the hijacking, on the fourth day, while the other hostages were all rescued in a joint German-Somali rescue operation. |
| 13 October 1977 | | 86 other passengers and 3 other crew members | PFLP militants | Mogadishu, Somalia | Various | Rescued | Dillmann, a German flight attendant who later became a sculptor, and Canellas, a Spanish-German entrepreneur, were aboard Lufthansa Flight 181, piloted by fellow German Schumann, when it was hijacked by four PFLP extremists, who travelled across several countries over five days before landing in Mogadishu, Somalia. Schumann was murdered by Zohair Yousif Akache, the leader of the hijacking, on the fourth day, while the other hostages were all rescued in a joint German-Somali rescue operation. |
| 9 November 1977 | | Jill Barcomb | Rodney Alcala | (United States) Santa Monica Mountains, California, U.S. | 18 | Murdered | Barcomb was an 18-year-old who had moved to Los Angeles from New York. She was murdered by serial killer Rodney Acala approximately three weeks after arriving in California. Although Barcomb had been arrested in New York for prostitution in September 1977, she had reportedly relocated to Los Angeles to attempt a fresh start at life the following month. Barcomb resided in a motel and reportedly primarily earned money via sex work at the time of her murder. |
| 15 November 1977 | | Megumi Yokota | North Korean government | Niigata Prefecture, Japan | 13 | Unknown | Megumi Yokota was a Japanese citizen who was abducted by a North Korean agent in 1977, when she was a thirteen-year-old junior high school student. She was one of at least 17 Japanese citizens kidnapped by North Korea in the late 1970s and early 1980s. The North Korean government has admitted to kidnapping Yokota, but has said that she died in captivity. Yokota's parents and others in Japan have publicly expressed the belief that Yokota is still alive in North Korea and have waged a public campaign seeking her return to Japan. |

== 1978 ==
| Date | Image | Victim(s) | Abductor(s) | Location | Age of victim(s) | Outcome | Notes |
|---|---|---|---|---|---|---|---|
| 24 January 1978 | | Susan Matlock | Jeffrey Lynn Hand | (United States) Kokomo, Indiana, U.S. | Unknown | Survived | Abducted at gunpoint from a shopping mall by Jeffrey Lynn Hand, who abandoned the kidnapping following a police pursuit. Shortly thereafter, Hand was fatally after firing at the pursuing officers. |
| 1978 – March 13, 1986 | | Choi Eun-hee | North Korean government | Hong Kong | 51 | Escaped | South Korean actress Choi Eun-hee was kidnapped in January 1978, causing her former husband, filmmaker Shin Sang-ok, to search for her and ultimately get kidnapped in July of that year. Kim Jong Il ordered his agents to kidnap them and bring them to North Korea to work in its film industry. Shin directed seven films for Kim, including Pulgasari (1985). The couple escaped in 1986. |
| 1978 – March 13, 1986 | | Shin Sang-ok | North Korean government | Hong Kong | 51 or 52 | Escaped | South Korean actress Choi Eun-hee was kidnapped in January 1978, causing her former husband, filmmaker Shin Sang-ok, to search for her and ultimately get kidnapped in July of that year. Kim Jong Il ordered his agents to kidnap them and bring them to North Korea to work in its film industry. Shin directed seven films for Kim, including Pulgasari (1985). The couple escaped in 1986. |
| 1978 | | Doina Bumbea | North Korean government | Pyongyang, North Korea (tricked into going to the city) | 28 | Retained until death | Bumbea, a Romanian painter, was possibly kidnapped to provide wives to American defectors in North Korea to prevent them from marrying Korean women and having ethnically mixed Korean children. Bumbea was forcibly married to James Joseph Dresnok and died in Pyongyang in January 1997 from lung cancer. |
| 16 March 1978 | | Aldo Moro | Red Brigades | Rome, Italy | 61 | Murdered | Moro, former Italian Prime Minister, was captured by a Marxist-Leninist urban guerilla organization and killed almost two months later. |
| 20 March 1978 | | Denise McGregor | Unknown | Wallan, Australia | 12 | Murdered | Denise McGregor was a 12-year-old girl who was reported missing on 20 March 1978, after last being seen purchasing goods at a store. Her body was found the next day; she had been abducted, strangled, and sexually assaulted. |
| 25 April 1978 | | Linda Goldstone | Hernando Williams | (United States) Chicago, Illinois, U.S. | 29 | Murdered | Goldstone was kidnapped and raped by Hernando Williams, who held her captive for 36 hours and later murdered her by shooting. Williams was convicted of the murder and executed on March 22, 1995. |
| 25 April 1978 | | Lee Kim Lai | Ong Chin Hock, Yeo Ching Boon and Ong Hwee Kuan | Mount Vernon, Singapore | 18 | Murdered | Lee Kim Lai was a police officer who was kidnapped from a sentry post and killed for his gun. |
| 25 April 1978 | | Thomas King | Darrell Crook and Gregory Fischer | Saskatoon, Saskatchewan, Canada | 40 | Murdered | A constable of the Royal Canadian Mounted Police in Saskatoon, Saskatchewan. King was ambushed, overpowered, beaten, and ultimately shot to death by local high school students Darrell Crook and Gregory Fischer following a routine traffic stop. His body was then mutilated and discarded in the South Saskatchewan River. |
| 3 August 1978 | | Craig Long | Larry Eyler | (United States) Terre Haute, Indiana, U.S. | 19 | Survived | The first attempted murder victim of serial killer Larry Eyler. |
| 11 August 1978 | | Valda Connell | John Cribb | Swansea, New South Wales, Australia | 39 | Murdered | 39-year-old Valda Connell and two of her children were kidnapped and murdered. |
| 11 August 1978 | | Sally Connell | John Cribb | Swansea, New South Wales, Australia | 10 | Murdered | 39-year-old Valda Connell and two of her children were kidnapped and murdered. |
| 11 August 1978 | | Damien Connell | John Cribb | Swansea, New South Wales, Australia | 4 | Murdered | 39-year-old Valda Connell and two of her children were kidnapped and murdered. |
| 20 August 1978 | | Clinton Avenue Five | Philander Hampton, Lee Evans (alleged) | (United States) Newark, New Jersey, U.S. | 16–17 | Unknown (presumed murdered) | The Clinton Avenue Five were five teenagers - Melvin Pittman, Ernest Taylor, Alvin Turner, Randy Johnson, and Michael McDowell - who disappeared on the night of 20 August 1978, having last been seen walking up Clinton Avenue together. 30 years after the disappearance, Philander Hampton confessed that he and Lee Evans had abducted and murdered the five boys as revenge for their having stolen cannabis from Evans; however, there was little evidence corroborating Hampton's claims. Hampton ultimately pled guilty to the crime, but Evans was acquitted and later sued the Newark police department for malicious prosecution. |
| 29 September 1978 | | Mary Vincent | Lawrence Singleton | (United States) Berkeley, California, U.S. | 15 | Survived | Hitchhiker Mary Vincent was picked up by Lawrence Singleton, who drove her into the woods, raped her, cut her arms off and left her for dead. She survived and later identified Singleton as her abductor. |
| 3 October 1978 | | Rosemary Jackson | Buddy Justus | Georgia, United States | 32 | Murdered | Jackson and Hawkins were both abducted and murdered by spree killer Buddy Justus, who was convicted and executed for the murders of Jackson, Hawkins and another woman, Ida Moses, in 1990. |
| 6 October 1978 | | Stephanie Hawkins | Buddy Justus | Florida, United States | 21 | Murdered | Jackson and Hawkins were both abducted and murdered by spree killer Buddy Justus, who was convicted and executed for the murders of Jackson, Hawkins and another woman, Ida Moses, in 1990. |

== 1979 ==
| Date | Image | Victim(s) | Abductor(s) | Location | Age of victim(s) | Outcome | Notes |
|---|---|---|---|---|---|---|---|
| 14 February 1979 | | Kenneth Kraus | Iranian militants | Tehran, Iran | 22 | Released | An United States Marine wounded and taken hostange by Iranian militants during the February 14, 1979 attack upon the United States Embassy in Tehran. Kraus was tortured for sensitive information before being sentenced to death. After one week of captivity, President Jimmy Carter and Ambassador William Sullivan secured his release. |
| 14 February 1979 | | Monique Hoyt | Rodney Alcala | (United States) Riverside County, California, U.S. | 15 | Escaped | A hitchhiker abducted by serial killer Rodney Acala. Hoyt was repeatedly raped and, at a location close in Joshua Tree, California, bludgeoned about the head. Hoyt subsequently escaped from Acala's vehicle when he subsequently parked his vehicle to enter a gas station restroom. |
| 1979–1980 (exact date unknown) | | Eklutna Annie | Robert Hansen | (United States) Anchorage, Alaska, U.S. | Between 16 and 25 | Murdered | An unidentified female was kidnapped by a serial killer. She was described by her murderer as either a prostitute or a topless dancer who attempted to escape from a vehicle after she was abducted. The victim was then stabbed in the back and buried in Eklutna, Alaska. Her body was discovered on 21 July 1980, between a month and a year after her death. |
| 11 May 1979 | | Rebecca Kunash | Bryan Frederick Jennings | (United States) Merritt Island, Florida, U.S. | 6 | Murdered | A six-year-old girl was kidnapped, raped and murdered by drowning in a canal. |
| 25 May 1979 | | Etan Patz | Pedro Hernandez | (United States) New York City, U.S. | 6 | Murdered | Etan walked to the school bus stop by himself, but did not arrive at school. The search for him brought attention to child abduction in the United States, and he was the first missing person to be pictured on a milk carton. The anniversary of his disappearance is International Missing Children's Day. Pedro Hernandez was charged with Etan's murder, but his 2015 trial ended in a hung jury. His retrial ended in guilty convictions for murder and kidnapping, with a life sentence and possibility of parole after 25 years. |
| 22 June 1979 | | Susan Reinert | Bill Bradfield, Jay C. Smith (alleged) (Note: Smith was convicted of conspiring to commit the abduction and murder in 1986, but his conviction was overturned in 1992 due to judicial and prosecutorial misconduct.) | (United States) Ardmore, Pennsylvania, U.S. | 36 | Murdered | 36-year-old Susan Reinert and her children Karen and Michael were taken after leaving home to attend a Parents without Partners meeting. Susan's car was later found in Harrisburg with her dead body stuffed in the trunk; Karen and Michael were never found, but were presumed to have been abducted and killed. Susan's fiancée, Bill Bradfield, and Jay Smith, the head teacher of the school where Susan and Bradfield both worked, were both separately convicted of conspiring to abduct and murder the Reinerts. Jay's conviction was later overturned due to prosecutorial misconduct. |
| 22 June 1979 | | Karen Reinert | Bill Bradfield, Jay C. Smith (alleged) | (United States) Ardmore, Pennsylvania, U.S. | 11 | Murdered | |
| 22 June 1979 | | Michael Reinert | Bill Bradfield, Jay C. Smith (alleged) | (United States) Ardmore, Pennsylvania, U.S. | 10 | Murdered | |
| 24 June 1979 | | Lucinda Lynn Schaefer | Lawrence Bittaker and Roy Norris | (United States) Redondo Beach, California, U.S. | 16 | Murdered | The first victim of serial killers Lawrence Bittaker and Roy Norris. Schaefer was last seen leaving a Presbyterian Church meeting in Redondo Beach. She was dragged into her abductors' vehicle and driven to the San Gabriel Mountains, where she was repeatedly raped, then strangled to death before her body was wrapped inside a plastic shower curtain and thrown over a cliff. Schaefer's body was never recovered. |
| 8 July 1979 | | Andrea Joy Hall | Lawrence Bittaker and Roy Norris | (United States) Pacific Coast Highway, Los Angeles, U.S. | 18 | Murdered | The second victim of serial killers Lawrence Bittaker and Roy Norris. Hall was lured into her abductors' GMC Vandura van, overpowered and driven to the San Gabriel Mountains, where she was sexually assaulted by both of her assailants before an ice pick was thrust through both her ear canals into her brain. She was then strangled to death before her body was thrown over a cliff. Hall's body was never recovered. |
| 21 July 1979 – 11 May 1981 | | Atlanta child murders | Wayne Williams (Note: Williams was only convicted of the murders of two adults from the time period but is officially considered responsible for about 24 of the murders linked to the case.) | (United States) Atlanta, Georgia, U.S. | Various | Murdered | Between July 1979 and May 1981, at least 28 black children, adolescents or young adults were abducted in the city of Atlanta. 27 were later found murdered, but one, 10-year-old Darron Glass, was never found. A common methodology of manual strangulation/asphyxiation linked at least 17 of the crimes to one perpetrator. A man named Wayne Williams is officially considered responsible for around 24 of the murders linked to the case but was only convicted of murdering two adults killed at around the same time in a similar fashion, although evidence directly linking him to some of the child murders has been found. The families of many victims have not accepted Williams' guilt, and some observers have accused the Atlanta P.D. of scapegoating Williams. |
| 19 August 1979 | | Katherine Jo Allen | Walter Blair Jr. | (United States) Kansas City, Missouri, U.S. | 21 | Murdered | Allen was a 21-year-old college student abducted at gunpoint from her apartment by Walter Blair, who had been paid $6,000 to execute her to prevent her from testifying against her alleged rapist at his upcoming trial. Her body was found twenty minutes after her abduction. She had been shot in the head and upper chest. |
| 25 August 1979 | | Betty McConnell | Terry Hyatt | (United States) Asheville, North Carolina, U.S. | 21 | Murdered | A victim of serial killer Terry Hyatt. McConnell disappeared en route to meet a friend at an Asheville bowling alley. She was discovered mortally wounded close to the unincorporated community of Alexander hours after her sister reported her disappearance; McConnell died shortly thereafter. |
| 3 September 1979 | | Jackie Doris Gilliam | Lawrence Bittaker and Roy Norris | (United States) Hermosa Beach, California, U.S. | 15 | Murdered | The third and fourth victims of serial killers Lawrence Bittaker and Roy Norris. The two girls were lured into their abductors' vehicle after they were observed sitting on a bus stop bench near Hermosa Beach. They were overpowered and driven to the San Gabriel Mountains, where they were held captive for almost two days before their murders. Gilliam was struck in each ear with an ice pick, and then strangled to death; Lamp was then bludgeoned and strangled to death. |
| 3 September 1979 | | Jacqueline Leah Lamp | Lawrence Bittaker and Roy Norris | (United States) Hermosa Beach, California, U.S. | 13 | Murdered | The third and fourth victims of serial killers Lawrence Bittaker and Roy Norris. The two girls were lured into their abductors' vehicle after they were observed sitting on a bus stop bench near Hermosa Beach. They were overpowered and driven to the San Gabriel Mountains, where they were held captive for almost two days before their murders. Gilliam was struck in each ear with an ice pick, and then strangled to death; Lamp was then bludgeoned and strangled to death. |
| 19 October 1979 | | Carolyn Brigman | Terry Hyatt | (United States) North Carolina, U.S. | 40 | Released | Carolyn Brigman was abducted by Terry Hyatt, who had left her workplace of job at Krispy Kreme and was threatened with bodily harm before being let go. |
| 31 October 1979 | | Shirley Lynette Ledford | Lawrence Bittaker and Roy Norris | (United States) Sunland-Tujunga, Los Angeles, U.S. | 16 | Murdered | The final victim of serial killers Lawrence Bittaker and Roy Norris. Ledford was lured into her murderers' GMC Vandura van and subjected to a two-hour ordeal of sexual abuse and torture before she was strangled to death with a wire coat hanger. Her body was discarded upon a bed of ivy within the front lawn of a Sunland property. |
| 4 November 1979 | | Bruce Laingen | Iranian militants | Tehran, Iran | 57 | Released | Laingen, Morefeld, Tomseth, and Limbert were among 52 American diplomats and citizens held captive during the Iran hostage crisis. They were released after 444 days of captivity on 20 January 1981. |
| 4 November 1979 | | Richard Morefield | Iranian militants | Tehran, Iran | 49 | Released | Laingen, Morefeld, Tomseth, and Limbert were among 52 American diplomats and citizens held captive during the Iran hostage crisis. They were released after 444 days of captivity on 20 January 1981. |
| 4 November 1979 | | Victor L. Tomseth | Iranian militants | Tehran, Iran | 38 | Released | Laingen, Morefeld, Tomseth, and Limbert were among 52 American diplomats and citizens held captive during the Iran hostage crisis. They were released after 444 days of captivity on 20 January 1981. |
| 4 November 1979 | | John W. Limbert | Iranian militants | Tehran, Iran | c. 36 | Released | Laingen, Morefeld, Tomseth, and Limbert were among 52 American diplomats and citizens held captive during the Iran hostage crisis. They were released after 444 days of captivity on 20 January 1981. |
| 4 November 1979 | | 48 other hostages | Iranian militants | Tehran, Iran | Various | Released | Laingen, Morefeld, Tomseth, and Limbert were among 52 American diplomats and citizens held captive during the Iran hostage crisis. They were released after 444 days of captivity on 20 January 1981. |
| 5 November 1979 | | Martin Allen | Unknown | London Underground, England | 15 | Unknown, believed murdered | 15-year-old schoolboy Martin Allen vanished after getting on a London Underground (tube) train on the southbound Picadilly line platform at King's Cross station while on his way home from school. Witnesses came forward to say that they had seen a boy matching Allen's description being held by an unknown man with his arm round him at Gloucester Road tube station (on the Piccadilly line), with both the boy and man looking scared. They both got off at the next stop at Earls Court station, when the man said to the boy: "Don't try to run". |
