= Argentino del Valle Larrabure =

Argentine military officer (1932–1975)

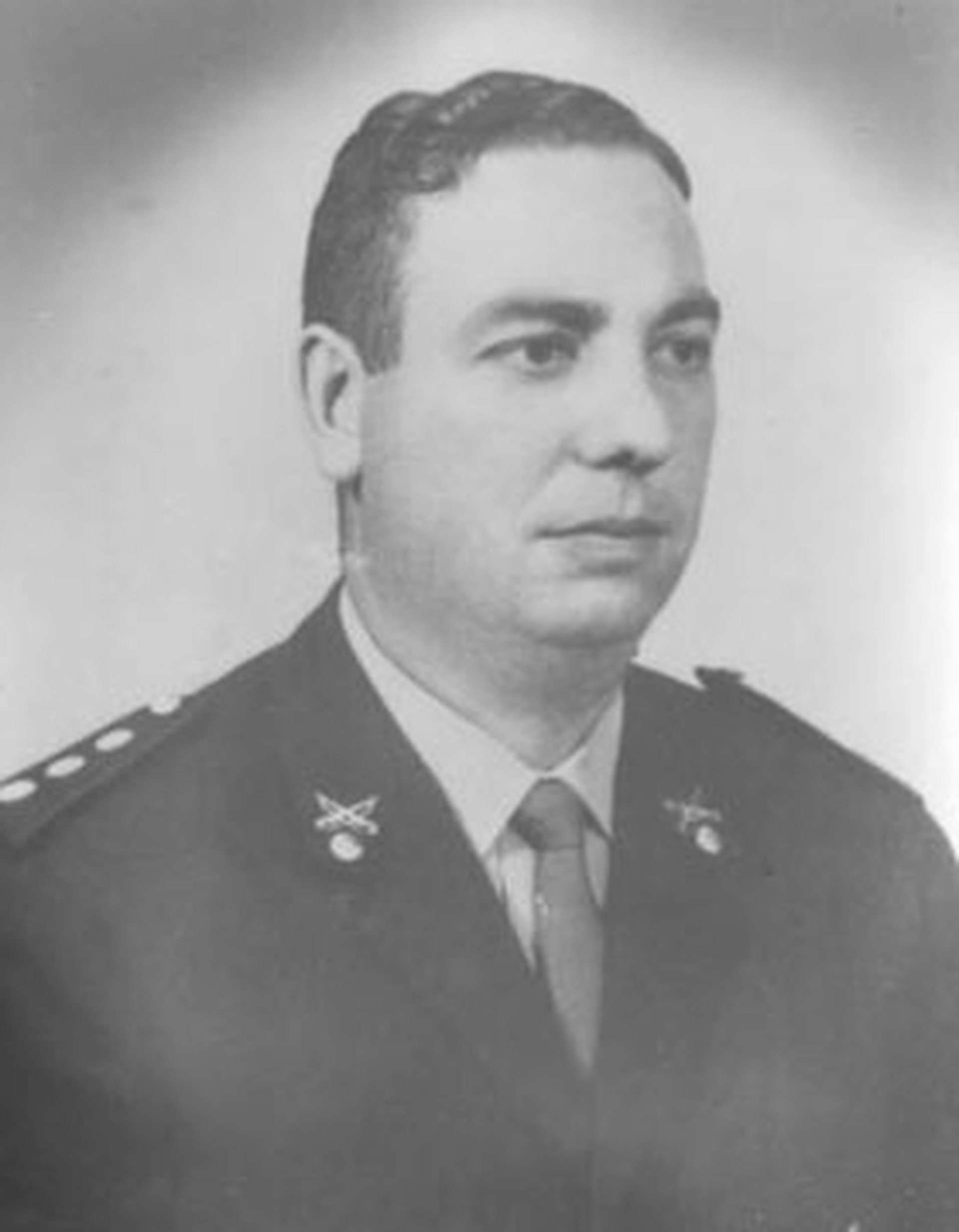
- Born: June 6, 1932; Tucumán, Argentina
- Died: August 19, 1975 (aged 43); Carcel del pueblo Santa Fe Argentina
- Cause of death: Murder
- Body discovered: On the outskirts of the city of Rosario
- Education: Ingeniero Químico Militar
- Occupation: Military officer
- Children: 2

Argentino del Valle Larrabure (6 June 1932 – 19 August 1975) was an Argentine military officer.

In 2022, the Holy See authorized his case in order to start a formal canonization process.

== Military career and death ==
As Lieutenant Colonel, he was vice director of the Military Factory of Guns and Explosives in Villa María, Córdoba and was kidnapped by the Marxist guerrilla organization People's Revolutionary Army (ERP) during an assault and jailed in a "people's prison" by the ERP during 372 days until his death.

According to the Argentine Army and many sources, he was killed by the organization; nevertheless, members of the ERP claim he committed suicide. The investigation never concluded and Larrabure's family started a campaign to resolve and condemn the perpetrators. After the opening of many processes against military officers during the Dirty War, the family wanted the calification of crimes against humanity for the kidnappers, but was denied by a court.

== Personal life and legacy ==
He was born in Tucumán into a family of Basque origins and studied at the Colegio Militar de la Nación as infantry officer. He is subject of many tributes by the Argentine Army, who promoted him post-mortem to Colonel rank.

== See also ==
- List of kidnappings (1970–1979)
