= Víctor Olea Alegría =

Chilean politician (1950 – disappeared 1974)

Víctor Fernando Olea Alegría
- Born: Víctor Fernando Olea Alegría; 17 June 1950; Santiago, Chile
- Disappeared: 11 September 1974 (aged 24); Santiago, Chile
- Political party: Socialist Party

Víctor Fernando Olea Alegría (17 June 1950 – disappeared 11 September 1974) was a Chilean socialist and member of the Socialist Party. Arrested by the Dirección de Inteligencia Nacional (DINA), Olea was enforceably disappeared as part of a DINA operation targeting members of the Socialist Party.

== Biography ==
Olea was born on 17 June 1950 in Santiago. Olea was a socialist and was a member of the Socialist Party.

At the time of his arrest Olea was working as a laborer and was living with his paternal aunt and uncle.

== Arrest ==
On 11 September 1974, Olea was arrested at his home by DINA agents. The following day Olea's home was raided by DINA agents, who removed several documents and his identity card. Olea was first taken to Central Investigation Headquarters where he was interrogated.

Olea's arrest and subsequent disappearance was part of a larger DINA operation targeting members of the Socialist Party. On 16 September, Olea was taken to Venda Sexy where he was held alongside fellow arrested Socialist Party members Claudio Venegas Lazzaro, Leonardo Rivas Balmaceda, Juan Carlos González Sandoval, Bernardo de Castro López, Agustín Holgado Bloch, Luis Olivares Toro, Luis Ahumada and Mario Carrasco Díaz. Juan Luis Tapia and Helios Figuerola were later held in the same cell.

The group were interrogated and tortured, wth Olea, Carrasco and Venegas being subjected to the most systematic torture. Carrasco, De Castro, Venegas, and Aliste were also disappeared. The rest were released on different days, and most were deported abroad. Among the DINA agents who acknowledged their participation in this operation was Osvaldo Romo Mena .

On 15 October 1974, an appeal for protection was filed in favour of Victor before the Court of Appeals of Santiago, which would be rejected on 3 December of that year after receiving negative reports from the authorities regarding the arrest.

== Sentencing ==
The following people were convicted in the case:

- Manuel Contreras Sepúlveda, army general and head of the DINA, would be sentenced to 10 years and 1 day as the author of the qualified kidnappings of Mario Carrasco Díaz and Víctor Olea Alegría.
- Raúl Iturriaga Neumann, army general and deputy director of the DINA, sentenced to 5 years and 1 day as the author of the qualified kidnappings of Mario Carrasco Díaz and Víctor Olea Alegría.
- Alejandro Molina Cisternas, a non-commissioned officer of the Carabineros and agent of the DINA, sentenced to 5 years and 1 day as co-author of the qualified kidnappings of Mario Carrasco Díaz and Víctor Olea Alegría.
- Gerardo Urrich González, army major and head of the Purén Unit of the Metropolitan Intelligence Brigade, sentenced to 5 years and 1 day as co-author of the qualified kidnappings of Mario Carrasco Díaz and Víctor Olea Alegría.
- Risiere Altez España, inspector of the Chilean Investigative Police and agent of the DINA, sentenced to 3 years and 1 day as co-author of the qualified kidnappings of Mario Carrasco Díaz and Víctor Olea Alegría.

Both Molina and Urrich received an 8-month sentence reduction in 2012.

== See also ==
- List of kidnappings (1970–1979)
- Operation Condor
