= Paul Martin Andrews =

American rape survivor and advocate (born 1959)

- Born: 1959 (age 66–67); Leesburg, Virginia, U.S.
- Occupation: Activist
- Known for: Advocacy for rape survivors in Virginia; rape survivor

Paul Martin Andrews (born 1959) is an American rape survivor and an advocate for rape survivors.

== Background ==
In 1973, Andrews was kidnapped in his native Virginia and hidden in an underground box by the convicted child abuser Richard Ausley. Thirty years after his ordeal, he went public with his story and became an activist for bolstering Virginia law with additional funding for continued civil commitments for sex offenders after their criminal sentences end.

In this case, Virginia did not get a chance to test its new Civil Commitment for Sexually Violent Predators Act. Ausley's sentence was extended by five years after another victim came forward.

In January 2004, Ausley was murdered in his prison cell by his cellmate Dewey Keith Venable, who had also been molested as a child. Andrews later said that he did not hate Ausley, and did not wish his death. Venable was charged with capital murder, but was later allowed to plead guilty to second degree murder. He had 12.5 years added to his sentence.

Andrews later said that he'd refused all treatment out of fear that his parents would send him away. His depression and loathing worsened after he realized that he was gay. His sexuality made him fear that people would think that he wanted to be raped.

== See also ==
- List of kidnappings (1970–1979)
- List of solved missing person cases (1970s)
