= Disappearance of Jason Shannon =

Missing Australian baby since 1973

Jason Shannon
- Born: Darren Jason Shannon; 1972
- Disappeared: 9 June 1973 (aged 11 months); Elizabeth West, South Australia, Australia
- Status: Missing for 52 years, 11 months and 17 days presumed dead

Darren Jason Shannon (born 1972) was an 11-month-old Australian baby who disappeared on 9 June 1973.

He was abducted by his father, Barry Shannon, who was then killed in a traffic accident approximately two hours later. Despite an extensive search Jason Shannon was not found at the scene of the crash and has never been located.

Although it is now presumed Jason Shannon died and was possibly murdered, police have considered the possibility that Barry Shannon may have given his son to a friend or family member to secretly raise before ending his own life.

A reward of up to $1 million is offered to anyone who provides information relating to Jason Shannon's suspected murder or reveals the whereabouts of his remains.

== Disappearance ==
Jason Shannon was abducted by his 26-year-old father Barry Shannon who had taken him at approximately 7:15 pm on 9 June 1973 during an access visit at the home of the baby's maternal grandparents in the Adelaide suburb of Elizabeth West.

Jason Shannon's parents Barry and Michelle Shannon had recently agreed to a temporary separation. Michelle Shannon had been residing with her parents in Blackdown Street in Elizabeth West after an incident in which her husband had hit her, prompting her to move out of the matrimonial home. Barry Shannon had been visiting his son every day during the separation.

Upon seeing Barry Shannon leaving the property with baby Jason, the baby's maternal grandfather Alfred Hinde attempted to stop him. Hinde then gave chase in his own vehicle, but was unable to locate him.

Two hours later, Barry Shannon was killed in a head-on collision with another vehicle on Main North Road near Roseworthy at approximately 9:15 pm. The two occupants of the other vehicle were taken to the Royal Adelaide Hospital.

Despite an extensive search of the crash site, baby Jason Shannon was not found at the scene and his whereabouts were unable to be determined.

Several days after Shannon disappeared, police said that they still hoped to find him alive. However, they admitted the period of time between Jason Shannon's abduction and Barry Shannon's car crash was causing them frustration. Michelle Shannon appeared on local television appealing to the public to help find her baby son.

Police called off the search for Jason Shannon on 15 June, but said detectives were following several leads.

Michelle Shannon and her parents left Adelaide in 1974, six months after losing Jason and returned to their native United Kingdom. She later remarried and had one son, and is now known as Michelle Swift. In 2016, Swift said that she still held onto a faint hope that her son was still alive.

In November 2015, Swift returned to the crash site to lay flowers.

== Investigation ==
Police concentrated on two possible theories as to what happened to Jason Shannon.

The first theory is that Barry Shannon murdered his son and disposed of the body before his fatal car crash, which he deliberately caused to end his own life. The second theory is that Barry Shannon left his baby son in an empty house or had given him to a friend or family member to raise in secret.

In 2016, the case was being investigated by the South Australia Police Major Crime Investigation Section, and formed part of a long-term cold case campaign called Operation Persist.

Discussing the case in 2016, Detective Sergeant Cameron Georg said police seriously considered the theory of Barry Shannon possibly giving his son to another person to raise in secret prior to the crash. This was especially as Barry Shannon's parents had wanted the baby to go to them after his separation. Georg appealed to the public for information if this happened to be the case, stating: "The paternal grandparents wanted Jason to stay with them. With this background maybe he had given the baby to a friend, relative or someone close to raise the baby as their own. If this was the case, we would very much like to hear from anyone who can shed any light on this...’

Detectives working on the case investigated whether Barry Shannon's now-deceased brother and parents left their estates to anyone who matched Jason Shannon's age upon each of their deaths, but this line of enquiry didn't provide any leads.

It was also revealed in 2016 that detectives were looking into information about Barry Shannon having formed a close bond with a female patient at the Fullarton Private Hospital where he had been treated for a mental illness.

=== Reward ===
Shannon is listed on the Crime Stoppers South Australia website as "missing, presumed murdered".

A reward of up to $1 million is being offered to anyone who provides information which leads to the conviction of those responsible for Shannon's suspected death or provides information relating to the whereabouts of his remains.

== See also ==
- List of kidnappings (1970–1979)
- List of people who disappeared mysteriously (1910–1970)
