= Murder of Denise McGregor =

Unsolved murder case

Denise McGregor
- Born: Denise Gail McGregor; 1964
- Died: 20 March 1978 (aged 13)
- Body discovered: 21 March 1978, near Merriang Road, Wallan, Australia
- Known for: Murder victim

Denise McGregor (1964-1978) was an Australian schoolgirl from Pascoe Vale, a suburb of Melbourne, Australia. She was kidnapped, raped and murdered on 20 March 1978. McGregor's assailant was never identified, and the case remains one of Melbourne's most infamous cold cases.

== Abduction and aftermath ==
Denise was abducted as she was returning home from running errands to a local milk bar at the corner of Westgate and Anderson streets, Pascoe Vale, around 7:30 pm.

The brutality of the murder was such that a pathologist described her injuries as being like those suffered by plane crash victims. A police re-enactment that screened at the time was reported to the broadcasting authorities as being excessively graphic, but the police chief said that it was toned down from what had happened to McGregor.

Robert Arthur Selby Lowe, convicted of the murder of Sheree Beasley, was a suspect in the murders of Denise McGregor and Kylie Maybury, but DNA evidence did not show any connection.

== See also ==
- List of kidnappings
- List of unsolved murders (1900–1979)
