= Indian rolling =

Hate crimes against Native Americans

Indian rolling (or Injun rollin') is the assault, and in some cases murder, of often homeless Navajo and Apache individuals committed by non-Indians in the Southwestern United States, especially in the border towns surrounding the Navajo Nation and Jicarilla lands. In her 2006 dissertation, Lisa Donaldson classifies Indian rolling as a "thrill-seeking hate crime" and traces its roots to the colonization of the Southwest which created a "power differential between groups that led to negative feelings toward minorities among law enforcement and local citizens".

The assaults, which often target comparatively defenseless alcoholic men, are variously described as "rites of passage", "sport", and a "recreational pastime" to the perpetrators. Survivors report the act involves being assaulted with rocks, pellet guns, bottles, eggs, and baseball bats. Victims claim, furthermore, that law enforcement officials often refuse to intervene.

== Chokecherry Canyon massacre ==
The term first came to public notoriety in April 1974 when three Navajos, Herman Dodge "Benjamin" Benally (34), John Earl Harvey (39) and David Ignacio (52) were abducted and bludgeoned to death by three white teenagers. Jesse Howard Bender and Delray Ballinger, both 16, and 15-year-old Matthew Clark murdered the three men in the city of Farmington, New Mexico and left the mutilated bodies in nearby Chokecherry Canyon. Benally and Harvey's bodies were discovered in mid April while Ignacio's was discovered a week later on 27 April The perpetrators were convicted of murder, but sent to a reform school after attempts to prosecute Bender and Ballinger as adults were unsuccessful (Clark was too young to be tried as an adult under state law at the time). None of them served more than two years in custody. Bender, who was considered the ringleader in the murders, died at age in 20 on October 1, 1977, after being struck in the head by the side mirrors of a van while jogging. Clark later served time in prison for convicted of forgery, theft, unauthorized use of a vehicle and escape in Texas. He served additional prison time in Washington for sexual abuse, forgery, and credit card fraud.

Subsequent protests by tribal members turned into riots when permits to march peacefully were revoked or not granted. The incident triggered a report by the New Mexico Advisory Committee to the United States Commission on Civil Rights and inspired the true crime-novel The Broken Circle—A True Story of Murder and Magic in Indian Country by Rodney Barker.

Concerns about the practice's revival emerged in the 1970s to 2000s after a resurgence of attacks against Native Americans in the area. Assaults have allegedly taken place in the Arizona cities of Flagstaff, Phoenix, and Page and in Gallup, New Mexico.

== See also ==
- Hate crime
- Lynching of Native Americans
- Missing and Murdered Indigenous Women
- Police brutality against Native Americans
- Saskatoon freezing deaths
- Thrill killing
