= Jeffrey Lynn Hand =

American murderer (1949–1978)

- Born: February 2, 1949; Washington, Indiana, U.S.
- Died: January 24, 1978 (aged 28); Kokomo, Indiana, U.S.
- Cause of death: Gunshot wound
- Conviction: N/A
- Penalty: N/A (Not guilty by reason of insanity)

Details
- Victims: 2+
- Span of crimes: 1972 – 1973 (known)
- Country: United States
- States: Indiana, possibly Wisconsin
- Date apprehended: June 17, 1973 (Thomas case)

Jeffrey Lynn Hand (February 2, 1949 – January 24, 1978) was an American murderer, kidnapper and suspected serial killer linked to two known murders committed in Indiana from 1972 to 1973. Deemed mentally unfit to stand trial for the latter, he was released and later killed following a botched kidnapping attempt in 1978. He was posthumously linked to the 1972 murder via DNA profiling, and authorities are currently investigating his possible involvement in other cases.

== Known crimes ==
=== Murder of Pamela Milam ===
On September 15, 1972, the bound and gagged body of 19-year-old Pamela Milam, an Indiana State University student, was found in the trunk of her own car by her father, who had gone looking for her after the girl failed to come home that night. She had been strangled with a rope at another location, but showed no signs of sexual assault and was found fully-clothed. At the time, no discernible motive could be ascertained regarding her death, and Milam's death went unsolved for decades.

=== The Thomas case ===
On June 16, 1973, Hand was driving along Highway 41 in his turquoise Chevrolet when he stopped to pick up an interracial couple, 22-year-old Jeffery Wayne Thomas and his 22-year-old wife Carol, who were hitchhiking back home to Evansville after visiting a friend in Chicago. Acting on the pretext that he lived on a farmhouse in nearby Warrenton, Hand agreed to take them there, but when they reached the road to Evansville, he suddenly said that he had to stop by at his aunt's house to get gas money. After they reached the farmhouse, Hand pulled out his .38 caliber revolver and aimed it at them, announcing that this was a hold-up. At first, the Thomases thought that he was joking, prompting Hand to fire a shot in the roof of the car.

After forcing Carol to tie up her husband's hands with a nylon cord and then tying Carol's hands himself, Hand confined them to an outbuilding for a period of time, coming back twice to talk to them. Having discovered that the Thomases had only $1.17, Hand said that he needed $500 to pay an attorney to file for bankruptcy. He proposed to hold one of them hostage while releasing the other to raise the $500 for ransom. He left the Thomases to discuss who would remain and who would go with Hand to raise the ransom. The two discussed this and determined that Mr. Thomas would be better able to raise the ransom than would Ms. Thomas. Each, however, believed that if Ms. Thomas did not escape, Hand would ultimately kill her. Subsequently, the two men got into Hand's 1964 Pontiac and left. In the meantime, Carol managed to free herself from her restraints, sufficiently bent the door of the outbuilding to reach the exterior latch, and ran towards a nearby farmhouse, alerting the state authorities in Evansville.

State troopers came and picked her up. They were waiting for Hand's return. He was arrested immediately upon his return and taken to the Gibson County Jail in Princeton. After enduring police questioning and talking to his father, Hand confessed that he had killed Thomas and would lead them to his body, which he had dumped along State Road 62. Thomas' hands had been tied, and he had been shot in the face with a .22 caliber rifle, his throat slashed and suffered eight stab wounds to his chest and abdomen. Following the location of the body, Hand was charged with first-degree murder. A few days later, authorities in Gibson County charged him with kidnapping for ransom. His bond was set for $100,000.

The murder of Jeffrey Thomas, who was black, raised racial tensions in the surrounding counties, causing several people to start throwing bricks and rocks at the cordoned off areas near the crime scene, injuring one woman in the process. In the end, Thomas' brother, Willie, appealed to both white and black people alike to refrain from causing any harm to one another. On June 25, Hand attempted to hang himself in his jail cell, but was saved by his cellmates, who held him down until the security guards could arrive. Following the incident, he was remanded to a special cell to undergo examinations by physicians. Due to this and his apparent refusal to communicate with anyone, his arraignment date was moved back to July 30. After several delays, including a change in venue to Bloomington, Indiana (Monroe County). Hand's murder trial began on October 11 and lasted 8 days, during which the prosecutors demanded the death penalty for him. However, at the end of the trial, he was found not guilty by reason of insanity in the murder charge.

For his second trial in Gibson County, Justice Harvey Garrett ruled that, due to the abundance of publicity surrounding the case, that the venue would be moved to Sullivan County. Until the beginning of his trial, Hand was transferred to the Indiana Reformatory following an incident in which he severely beat up an inmate at a prison facility in Terre Haute. The arraignment was waived in June 1975, and after two months, he was again found not guilty by reason of insanity and ordered to be committed to the Norman Beatty Mental Hospital in Westville.

== Release, attempted kidnapping and death ==
On June 24, 1976, in spite of his attorney's protests, Hand was released and returned to his family in Washington, ostensibly to live a quiet life. However, on January 24, 1978, Hand went to the Markland Mall in Kokomo, where he abducted Susan Matlock at gunpoint. Fellow shoppers and store employees quickly notified police, who identified and pursued his vehicle. Hand's car was cut off at a nearby parking lot, causing him to ditch Matlock and flee on foot towards an alley, chased by Deputy Vernal Baugh. After seeing Baugh reach for his car radio, Hand drew a .32 caliber revolver and shot at Baugh, hitting him twice. The deputy leaped into a ditch for cover, at which time two other officers arrived on the scene and ordered Hand to give up. He refused to do so and ran towards a nearby railroad track, forcing deputies to shoot him three times. The injuries proved fatal, and Hand bled to death after crawling from the underside of a freight car.

== Posthumous findings ==
In May 2019, the Terre Haute Police Department announced that they had identified Hand as Milam's killer. This was achieved with the help of GEDmatch and Parabon NanoLabs, who had traced his widow and two sons and obtained their DNA, allowing them to build a family tree that eventually led to Hand. Following this identification, authorities across Indiana announced that they would be looking into whether he was responsible for cases in their jurisdictions, or possibly other states, focusing primarily in the period between 1976 and 1978. So far, authorities have publicly announced that he is being investigated for an unspecified murder in the state of Wisconsin.
