= John Cribb =

Australian murderer (1950–2018)

John Ernest Cribb
- Born: 5 August 1950
- Died: 21 February 2018 (aged 67); Goulburn Correctional Centre, Goulburn, New South Wales (died while incarcerated)
- Status: Deceased
- Criminal charges: Murder × 3, Rape × 3, Kidnapping × 2, False imprisonment × 2, Armed robbery × 9, Escaping lawful custody, conviction_penalty = 3 × life imprisonment + 45 years

John Ernest Cribb (5 August 1950 – 21 February 2018) was an Australian triple murderer from Sydney. At the time of his death, Cribb was serving three consecutive sentences of life imprisonment plus 45 years for the rape and murder of Valda Connell and the murder of her children, Sally and Damien, at Swansea, New South Wales, on 11 August 1978, in addition to numerous other offences.

== Criminal background ==
Cribb was on parole in August 1978, after having served six years of a nine-year sentence for armed robbery. He broke into the Connell family's Baulkham Hills home. When he came out at about 3 pm, Valda Connell, 39, had just come home in her car with two of her six children, Sally (aged 10) and Damien (aged 4). He kidnapped them and drove north. He later rang Valda's husband, Paul, from a phonebox and said he had been having an affair with Valda, who had now run away with him and the two children to Queensland.

Police initially believed Cribb's story. Meanwhile, Cribb drove the family to Mangrove Mountain, where he sexually assaulted Valda. He then drove them on to Ellenborough Falls, where he left the three gagged and bound before initially driving off towards Newcastle, New South Wales. However he changed his mind and returned to Ellenborough Falls, where he then stabbed the three to death. Finding the ground too hard to bury his victims, he put their bodies in the boot of the car and drove to Newcastle with the aim of burying them in softer sand near the beach. He enlisted the services of a tow truck after the vehicle became stuck, before heading off to hospital to have a self-inflicted wound sutured. Thereafter he went to a pub before again setting off on the Pacific Highway. He crashed the car off the side of the road in the Swansea area of Newcastle, and once again enlisted the help of the same tow truck company. Upon retrieving the Connnel's vehicle from the side of the road, the boot popped open, revealing the bodies.

The family heard nothing until they were on their way to church on Sunday morning; Paul Connell and his other children learned the bodies of Valda, Sally and Damien had been found in a car boot near Swansea.

Following widespread media coverage, a member of the public identified Cribb, who took a hostage at knifepoint when police arrived. He was arrested after a ten-hour siege.

== Arrest ==
After his arrest, Cribb was diagnosed with paranoid schizophrenia and placed in a ward for the criminally insane at Morisset Hospital. He escaped one month later with convicted armed robber William Munday, who was serving a 28-year sentence.

Before they were recaptured, they had committed eight armed robberies, multiple assaults, and had kidnapped two 17-year-old schoolgirls from outside the Hakoah Club in Bondi, taken them to a hotel, held them hostage, and repeatedly sexually assaulted them over a 35-hour period; Cribb later sent the girls Christmas cards from prison. Both men were sentenced in early 1979 to an additional 30 years for the crime spree, while Cribb was sentenced later that year to a further 12 years for rape and three consecutive life terms for the murders.

Munday was sentenced in 1983 to a consecutive sentence of life imprisonment for his involvement in the murder of fellow inmate Stephen Shipley at Parramatta Jail in 1981, and died of a heart attack in the exercise yard of Maitland Prison in 1993.

== Applications for parole ==
Cribb applied for a non-parole period to be set in 1993, with the application heard by Justice Peter Newman. Cribb had become a Christian in 1982, and several psychiatrists and psychologists reported he was a reformed character, as did a number of Christian ministers, prison visitors (Cribb married one of his visitors, who was now gravely ill) and prison officers. One Christian minister said Cribb would work with him if he got out of jail.

However, a letter Cribb had written to the court came to light, claiming he had not raped Valda at all, and that the murders had been "instigated" by her refusal to admit Sally was his daughter. Justice Newman found these claims to be "grotesque lies" that contradicted the claim Cribb had reformed, and represented "an attempt to manipulate a situation where the prisoner might obtain his release" and a "lack of contrition".

They indicated that "well-meaning persons from the community who have supported his application have probably been duped by the applicant's claims of reformation", and Newman dismissed the application. Cribb withdrew a second application for a non-parole period to be set in 2008, and it was expected that Cribb should die in custody.

== Death ==
Cribb died in Goulburn, New South Wales at Goulburn Correctional Centre, a 75-bed supermax prison with the highest level of security in Australia, on 21 February 2018, at the age of 67. Because Cribb died while in custody, his death will be investigated by the NSW police as well as the NSW coroner.

== TV Episode ==
The whole story is told in a 2008 episode of the "Crime Investigation Australia" series, titled "The Devil Inside - John Ernest Cribb." As shown in 2021, the episode was briefly extended to mention the 2018 death of Cribb.
