= McCulkin murders =

1974 triple homicide

The McCulkin murders were the murders of Barbara McCulkin (34) and her two daughters, Vicki (13) and Leanne (11), in Queensland in 1974.

== Crime ==
On 16 January 1974, the victims disappeared from their home in Highgate Hill, a suburb of Brisbane, Queensland, Australia. The daughters had been across the street attending a neighbour’s 10th birthday party, returning around 10:30 pm. Their mother had remained at home relaxing and drinking in the company of two men who had arrived in a distinctive coupe.

The McCulkins were reported missing by their estranged husband/father two days later. Investigations revealed an orange 2-door Valiant Charger had been seen in the driveway. Further, the family cats were locked inside, the beds had not been slept in, and the lights and other electrical items remained on. The overall police response was slow and ineffective and the case quickly turned cold.

== Trial ==
On 2 April 1980, Vincent O'Dempsey, the owner of the Charger and a criminal acquaintance of the husband, and Garry Dubois, were charged with their abduction and murder. The case, however, fell apart due to insufficient evidence.

After a tipoff to Crime Stoppers, in October 2014, the pair were finally charged again based on information that the victims had been tied up, driven to bushland, raped, strangled, and buried. On 28 November 2016, Dubois (then aged 69) was found guilty of the murders. On 26 May 2017, O'Dempsey (then aged 78) was also found guilty of murder. Both were sentenced to life imprisonment on 1 June 2017.

The next day, Queensland Attorney-General Yvette D'Ath announced that the state government would re-open the coronial inquest into the March 1973 Whiskey Au Go Go fire. Another related case was the 23 February 1973 firebombing of Torino’s Nightclub, an insurance scam organised by Dubois on O’Dempsey’s orders. Justice Peter Applegarth said "it was clear Barbara McCulkin knew enough about each of the pair's roles in the nightclub bombings at the time for them to want to silence her."

== Media ==
60 Minutes covered the case and the trial in 2017 in a report called "Breaking the code". Both arson cases, the murders, and Dempsey’s extensive criminal history were extensively reviewed in 2020 in an 8-part Australian crime podcast titled Ghost Gate Road by journalist Matthew Condon.
