= Murder of Lori Smith =

1976 kidnapping and murder of a young girl in Cobb County, Georgia, U.S.

Lori Smith
- Born: Lori Ann Smith; September 26, 1967; Cobb County, Georgia, U.S.
- Died: May 4, 1976 (aged 8); Cobb County, Georgia, U.S.
- Cause of death: Death by drowning
- Occupation: Student
- Known for: Victim of a kidnapping-murder case
- Parent(s): W. Scott Smith (father); Joyce Smith (mother)

On May 4, 1976, in Cobb County, Georgia, U.S., eight-year-old Lori Ann Smith (September 26, 1967 – May 4, 1976) and a ten-year-old girl, whose identity has not been publicly disclosed, were both kidnapped by Virgil Delano Presnell Jr. (born December 29, 1953), who raped and sodomized the older victim. Presnell subsequently murdered Smith by drowning her in a stream when she tried to escape. Presnell was later convicted of Smith's murder and sentenced to death. Originally scheduled to be executed in 2022, Presnell's execution is currently on hold due to legal issues. Presnell is currently the longest-serving death row inmate in Georgia.

== Murder ==
On May 4, 1976, in Cobb County, Georgia, two young girls were abducted by a man, who raped the older of the two while murdering the younger of the two by drowning.

Prior to this incident, the kidnapper, 22-year-old Virgil Delano Presnell Jr., planned to kidnap a young girl. On April 23, 1976, Presnell abducted a ten-year-old girl while she was walking from school, and although he grabbed her and threatened her with a knife, the victim managed to escape and Presnell's first kidnap attempt failed. Less than two weeks later, on May 3, 1976, Presnell decided to carry out his plan a second time, and staked out an elementary school in Cobb County, where he saw a different ten-year-old schoolgirl walking home on a wooded trail.

Selecting the ten-year-old as his next target, Presnell would return to the same place the next day, and planned to kidnap her. Afterwards, the girl was found walking down the trail with her eight-year-old friend, identified as Lori Ann Smith. Presnell abducted both girls after he emerged from his hiding place, and he forcibly brought the girls into his car. He also taped up their mouths and threatened to kill the girls if they did not cooperate, and even told them he had a gun. While he was driving, Presnell forced the ten-year-old to perform sodomy on him and he himself used his finger to perform sexual penetration on the girl.

After driving to a secluded area, Presnell brought the two girls into the woods, where he forced them to undress and he proceeded to rape the older girl. Smith tried to escape, but Presnell caught her and therefore forced her face underwater in a creek, drowning eight-year-old Lori Smith to death. After murdering Smith, Presnell once again sexually assaulted the ten-year-old and forced her inside the trunk of his car. After driving for a distance, Presnell's car tire became flat and despite Presnell's order for her to stay, the girl walked to a gas station and later told the police about Presnell's crimes. Presnell, who lived in an apartment near the crime scene, was arrested there while he was changing the tire.

Despite his initial denials, Presnell later admitted to the murder of Smith and the rape of the ten-year-old, and even led the police to where he left Smith's body after the killing. A handgun and child pornography depicting young girls were later recovered by police during a search of Presnell's apartment.

== Trial of Virgil Presnell Jr. ==
Virgil Delano Presnell Jr.
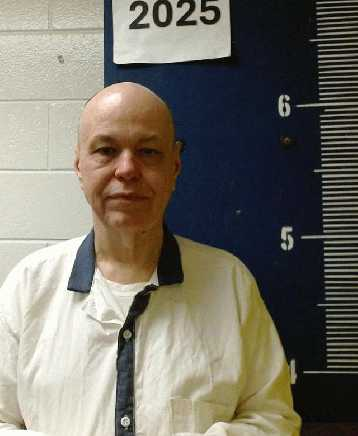
- 2025 mugshot
- Born: December 29, 1953 (age 72); Georgia, U.S.
- Status: Incarcerated on death row
- Convictions: Malice murder Kidnapping; Rape; Kidnapping with bodily injury
- Penalty: Death

Details
- Victims: Lori Ann Smith, 8 (murdered); Unnamed rape victim
- Date: May 4, 1976
- Location: Cobb County, Georgia
- Imprisoned at: Georgia Diagnostic and Classification State Prison

A day after his arrest, Virgil Presnell Jr. was charged with the kidnapping of both Lori Smith and the ten-year-old, as well as the rape of older girl and the malicious murder of Smith.

On May 26, 1976, Presnell was formally indicted by a Cobb County grand jury for the charges of murdering Smith and the kidnapping of both Smith and the older girl.

Presnell subsequently stood trial before a jury at the Cobb County Superior Court. In his taped confession, Presnell admitted that he had pushed Smith down the creek until she stopped moving, and even said that one of the girls had a pornographic look and he wanted to stay with her for a while. However, in his court testimony, Presnell said that he accidentally fell on top of Smith while the girl was still gasping for air as he pulled her to the creek bank and left the scene. An autopsy report confirmed that the cause of Smith's death was indeed drowning. Additionally, a court-appointed psychiatrist testified that Presnell could still know right from wrong despite the fact that Presnell himself claimed that the girls never put up a protest against him and he inferred from this that he never did any wrongdoing.

On August 26, 1976, the jury returned with their verdict, and found Presnell guilty of the kidnapping and murder of Smith, and the kidnapping with bodily injury and rape of the ten-year-old. On that same day, the jury recommended the death penalty for the charge of murder, and therefore, 22-year-old Virgil Presnell Jr. was sentenced to death by Judge Luther Hames for the murder of Smith. Presnell was also handed two death sentences for the charges of kidnapping and raping the older girl, in addition to 20 years' imprisonment for kidnapping Smith.

== Appeal process ==
On March 7, 1978, the Georgia Supreme Court rejected the appeal of Virgil Presnell and upheld both his murder conviction and death sentence, but the same court vacated his other two death sentences for the convictions of rape and kidnapping, and directed the lower courts to re-sentence Presnell on these charges.

On November 6, 1978, on the grounds of technical reasons, the U.S. Supreme Court overturned Presnell's last remaining death sentence for the murder of Lori Smith and remanded it back to the Georgia Supreme Court. On February 6, 1979, the Georgia Supreme Court re-imposed the death penalty for Presnell, after finding that there were aggravating factors that made Presnell eligible to be executed.

Originally, Presnell was scheduled to be executed on June 15, 1981, but he was granted a stay of execution by U.S. District Judge Marvin Herman Shoob, pending an appeal from Presnell in a bid to overturn his death sentence.

On January 11, 1988, the 11th U.S. Circuit Court of Appeals dismissed Presnell's appeal against his death sentence.

On April 15, 1992, the death sentence of Presnell was overturned by the 11th U.S. Circuit Court of Appeals in favour of a re-sentencing trial, and he was temporarily removed from death row by 1997.

On March 16, 1999, after some deliberations, a second Cobb County jury once again sentenced Presnell to the death penalty for murdering Lori Smith back in 1976.

On July 16, 2001, the Georgia Supreme Court rejected Presnell's appeal and upheld his death sentence.

On March 25, 2013, Presnell's federal appeal was dismissed by U.S. Senior District Judge Clarence Cooper of the U.S. District Court for the Northern District of Georgia.

On September 16, 2020, the 11th U.S. Circuit Court of Appeals turned down Presnell's second federal appeal against his death sentence.

On October 4, 2021, the U.S. Supreme Court rejected Presnell's final appeal.

== 2022 execution attempt and stay ==
On April 27, 2022, nearly 46 years after he murdered Lori Smith, 68-year-old Virgil Presnell Jr. was scheduled to be executed on May 17, 2022.

On May 9, 2022, Presnell's lawyers filed an appeal and alleged that the state's decision to set his execution date was the violation of an agreement that effectively put executions on hold during the COVID-19 pandemic and carry certain conditions under which they could resume if fulfilled (like the end of the pandemic judicial emergency, the normal visitation rights and availability of the vaccines to members of the public).

A clemency hearing was set to commence before the state's parole board on May 14, 2022. Presnell's lawyers argued that Presnell deserved to be spared the death sentence and submitted that Presnell had significant cognitive impairments that contributed to his crimes and the abuse he suffered in prison. The counsel also stated that Presnell was "deeply and profoundly sorry" for what he had done to the two young girls back in 1976. It was further adduced to the board that Presnell's mother was addicted to alcohol while pregnant with Presnell, and his school records showed that Presnell, who came from an "abusive and unstable" family background, had a history of serious developmental disabilities.

On May 16, 2022, the eve of Presnell's execution, the five-member panel of the Georgia State Board of Pardons and Paroles rejected Presnell's clemency petition and allowed the execution to move forward. However, on that same day, Fulton County Superior Court Judge Shermela Williams issued a temporary stay of execution for Presnell, after hearing his lawyers' argument in relation to the COVID-19 agreement. On May 17, 2022, the prison officials confirmed that the execution would not be carried out as scheduled.

Apart from this, Presnell's lawyers filed a separate appeal on May 18, 2022, and sought to overturn Presnell's death sentence, on the account that Presnell had significant cognitive impairments that amounted to intellectual disability and/or made Presnell behave like a child, and the death penalty was prohibited for convicts with intellectual disabilities. However, the Georgia Supreme Court rejected Presnell's appeal on May 31, 2022.

On May 24, 2022, the death warrant issued for Presnell was officially expired and Presnell was therefore not executed. After this development, the families of the two girls stated that they were deeply upset and disappointed by the fact that Presnell would not be executed. They expressed the grief and pain they endured as a result of Presnell's crimes and talked about the long wait for justice to be served with his execution, which they desperately wanted to witness after more than four decades since the murder and rape happened. The families had earlier stated their opposition to clemency for Presnell.

== Subsequent legal developments ==
In September 2022, the Georgia Supreme Court began to hear the lawsuit of Presnell's lawyers in relation to the agreement. On December 20, 2022, the Georgia Supreme Court's six-judge panel unanimously ruled that the state should continue to adhere to the COVID-19 agreement until all the conditions were fulfilled, and in the meantime, Presnell and the other inmates covered by the agreement would not have their death sentences carried out.

Two years after the state postponed Presnell's execution, in February 2024, the Georgia authorities set the execution date of convicted rapist-killer Willie James Pye, who was not one of the inmates covered by the COVID-19 agreement. Pye, who was found guilty of abducting, raping and murdering his ex-girlfriend Alicia Lynn Yarbrough in 1993, was ultimately executed on March 20, 2024, which marked the state's first execution after a four-year moratorium on capital punishment due to the COVID-19 pandemic.

In October 2024, the family of Smith revealed that they, along with some friends, were still waiting for Presnell to be executed some day and they did not want Presnell to die of old age in prison or him escaping execution.

In February 2025, the state of Georgia sought to lift the COVID-19 agreement and stated that it no longer applied, which may allow the state to schedule execution dates of the inmates covered by the agreement. The defence counsel representing Presnell and the other death row inmates under the agreement argued that the conditions of the agreement were not met and hence their death sentences should not be carried out until they were all fulfilled. Should the agreement be overturned, Presnell will likely receive a new execution date. That same month itself, Smith's surviving family members and friends went to court to hear the case, and they affirmed their wish to witness Presnell's execution. A cousin of Smith stated that Smith's parents were still alive and feared that they would die before having the chance to see Presnell executed. A childhood friend of Smith stated there was no doubt that Presnell was guilty of murdering her friend.

On June 2, 2026, the Georgia Supreme Court overturned the COVID-19 agreement and sent the case back to the Fulton County Superior Court for another review. The court's opinion, penned by Justice Carla Wong McMillian, stated that the vaccine availability issue was effectively solved because the supply exceeded the demand and was available for members of the public, and that the medical consensus was that children under the age of six months were not recommended to take the vaccine, unless it was medically appropriate. The prison visitation issue was yet to be litigated at this point in time. The overturning of the execution ban also paved way to the possibility of resuming executions and a possible new death warrant for Presnell.

As of 2026, Virgil Presnell, who is incarcerated at the Georgia Diagnostic and Classification State Prison, is the longest-serving inmate on death row in Georgia, having spent approximately 50 years behind bars.

== See also ==
- Capital punishment in Georgia (U.S. state)
- List of death row inmates in the United States § Georgia
- List of longest prison sentences served
