= Robert Hohenberger =

American kidnapper, serial rapist and suspected serial killer

- Born: Robert Carl Hohenberger; 1943; Indiana, U.S.
- Died: May 31, 1978 (aged 34–35); Tacoma, Washington, U.S.
- Cause of death: Self-inflicted gunshot wound
- Other names: Frank Henry Green; Frank Harris
- Convictions: Rape; Kidnapping; Assault; Escape from prison
- Penalty: Life imprisonment (California)

Details
- Victims: 5 (not confirmed, died before trial)
- Span of crimes: March – May 1978
- Country: United States
- State: Louisiana

Robert Carl Hohenberger (1943 – May 31, 1978) was an American criminal, kidnapper and serial rapist, as well as the prime suspect in a series of murders committed against teenagers in Morgan City, Louisiana between March and May 1978. The FBI was brought in to investigate the killings, putting Hohenberger on a national wanted list, but he committed suicide before he could be apprehended.

== Biography ==
Little is known about Hohenberger's early life. It is known that he was born in 1943 in Indiana, but a few years after his birth, the family left the state and moved to Riverside County, California. In the mid-1960s, after meeting the local sheriff, he enlisted as an auxiliary police officer on a voluntary and unpaid basis. His duties included patrolling the streets in his free time from his main job, as well as monitoring the protection of citizens' rights and public order.

Using his official position, he began to carry out attacks on young girls and women. In 1966, he was arrested on charges of assaulting a woman, whom he had raped at gunpoint. Hohenberger was convicted, but some of the charges were later dropped after a plea deal was made, stating that both parties had reconciled. The victim stated that Hohenberger had made amends with her, and he promptly received a minor sentence. He was released two years later, leaving Riverside County and moving to Orange County.

In 1971, he was arrested in Laguna Beach for kidnapping two girls at gunpoint, for which he was found guilty and sentenced to life imprisonment, but with a right of parole after six months. Hohenberger was sent to serve his sentence at San Quentin State Prison, and by 1974, having established himself as a model prisoner, he was transferred to a cell with less security. On April 12, 1974, he escaped from the penitentiary; after escaping, he kidnapped 20-year-old Richard Debois and his wife Victoria, forcing them to take him to Modesto, where a friend of his lived. As he was unable to locate the house, he demanded the hostages take him to Los Banos. While Hohenberger refueled the car at a gas station next to the I-5, Debois and his wife managed to escape and report the incident to the authorities. Hohenberger was captured a few hours later and extradited to Marin County, where he was found guilty of escaping from detention.

In August 1977, Hohenberger was paroled again and returned to Riverside County. In October of the same year, he abducted a girl from Palm Desert, whom he beat and raped. The victim survived, and reported the attack to the police. In the following months, the victim identified Hohenberger as the perpetrator after a series of mugshots of sex offenders were shown to her, and so he was put on a national wanted list. Upon learning this, he fled California in January 1978, succeeding in evading capture by the state authorities.

== Murders ==
That same month, Hohenberger travelled down to Louisiana. He stayed in the small town of Bayou Vista, where, using the pseudonym Frank Henry Green, he found work and housing at R&M Service Inc., a supplier for welding equipment. Hohenberger often spent his free time in the neighboring town of Morgan City, where, in the same time period, five teenagers mysteriously disappeared from the area. The first to go missing was 16-year-old Mary Leah Rodermund, who disappeared on March 2 after going to the store to shop. A few hours after the girl disappeared, her parents were called by the kidnapper, who demanded $5,000 in ransom. To back his claims, the man allowed Mary to make a call to her parents, during which the girl confirmed that she had been abducted. The Rodermunds turned to the police, but after that, no trace of either Mary or her kidnapper was found.

On April 27, 19-year-old Bridget Cantrell Sons and 17-year-old Gordon Mark Cannella went missing following a robbery at a store in Morgan City. While inspecting the premises, the police found the missing girl's handbag, as well as an unfinished cigarette. A car and a pack of cigarettes were found in the parking lot. On May 11, 15-year-old Judy Adams and 14-year-old Bertha Gould went missing after attending the Central Catholic School Fair being held at the Morgan City Municipal Auditorium. Initially, both girls were considered runaways, but further investigation established that before disappearing, they had got into a car driven by an unfamiliar white man. After checking the vehicle's registration plate, the police identified the man as Frank Green, whose real identity was revealed following an examination of his fingerprints. During the investigation, the police interrogated Hohenberger's neighbor, 38-year-old Sydney Harris, who, after the fact, contacted him and told him about the impending arrest, giving him an opportunity to flee. Harris was subsequently arrested and charged with harboring a fugitive.

On May 26, in the sewage system of Bayou Vista, not far from where Hohenberger worked, the bound bodies of two girls with signs of abuse and strangulation were found. They were subsequently identified as Bridget Sons and Judy Adams. The next day, in a field outside the city, Gordon Cannella's body was found. A rope had been tied around his neck, leaving a strangulation mark. After that, the police, in order to find the bodies of other missing teenagers, conducted a search operation with the participation of several law enforcement agencies and volunteers who examined abandoned buildings, fields, forests and sewers. With the help of divers, nearby rivers and local swamps were examined, but the operation was unsuccessful. Nevertheless, Hohenberger was put on a wanted list.

== Death ==
Hohenberger was discovered by police on May 31, 1978, in Tacoma, Washington, after he tried to sell a stolen car. During an attempted arrest by four plainclothes law enforcement officers, he fiercely resisted, pulling out a .22 caliber pistol and shooting himself in the head. He was taken to the St. Joseph Medical Center, where he underwent brain surgery, but on the same day, he died a few hours after the surgery due to complications. The incident was subsequently recognized as a suicide.

While investigating Hohenberger's activities, it was established that he had been in Tacoma since May 23, using the alias of Frank Harris to look for work. During a search of his rented apartment, a 12-gauge shotgun and several knives were found. Based on this, Hohenberger was among the suspects in the abduction-murders of three other youths, whose killers demonstrated a similar modus operandi: two teenagers were found shot dead with a .22 pistol in Boca Raton, Florida in early 1978, as well as another youth who had been abducted from Cartersville, Georgia. A forensic ballistics test of his pistol and shell casings found at the scene of the Boca Raton murders was carried out, which concluded that Hohenberger was not involved in that particular case.

== See also ==
- List of serial killers in the United States
