= Richard Frederick Dixon =

American criminal

Richard Frederick Dixon (born August 5, 1940) is an American criminal principally known for hijacking Eastern Airlines Flight 953 from Detroit to Cuba in October 1971 and for the second degree murder of South Haven police officer, Michael McAllister, in January 1976. He was convicted on these charges after his capture in 1976. He was sentenced in Michigan state court to life in prison on the murder charge and in federal court to an additional 40 years on federal charges of air piracy and kidnapping.

Born in Pontiac, Michigan, and raised in St. Clair, Michigan, he served two years in the United States Navy. He was convicted of a 1963 robbery in New York, but only after a four-year detention in a mental hospital when he was found incompetent to stand trial. He was also convicted of the 1968 burglary of a credit union in St. Clair.

== Early years ==
Dixon was born in Pontiac, Michigan, in 1940. He grew up in St. Clair, Michigan, graduating from St. Clair High School in 1958. He served in the United States Navy from January 1959 to March 1961 when he received an honorable discharge.

== Prior criminal history ==
=== Robbery conviction and hospitalization in New York ===
Dixon was arrested in New York in 1963 for robbery. He was initially found incompetent to stand trial and spent three years at Matteawan State Hospital for the Criminally Insane. Matteawan was New York's hospital for the criminally insane from 1892 until its closure in 1976. He pleaded guilty in 1967, received a suspended sentence, and was placed on probation.

=== Burglary at credit union ===
On Sunday, March 17, 1968, at 6:30 a.m., Dixon was arrested for burglary at the Diamond Crystal Employee's Federal Credit Union in St. Clair, Michigan. A neighbor heard a noise at the credit union and called the police. A police officer, Elmer D. Shirkey, responded to the call and arrested Dixon as he tried to escape from the back of the building. He had stolen $16. Dixon was charged in federal court with robbery and pleaded guilty and was sentenced by Judge Thaddeus M. Machrowicz to 20 years in prison.

Dixon was imprisoned at the United States Penitentiary, Leavenworth. He took courses at Kansas State University while in prison and received 20 semester hours of credit. With credit for good behavior, he was released on probation on August 27, 1971.

== Hijacking of Eastern Airlines Flight 953 ==
On October 9, 1971, Dixon, at age 31, hijacked Eastern Airlines Flight 953 which had been scheduled to fly from Detroit to Miami and then to continue to San Juan, Puerto Rico. On the morning of the flight, Dixon bought a one-way ticket, using an alias of "R. Johnson." Prior to reaching a metal detector at the boarding gate, Dixon pulled a .38-caliber pistol, told employees to get out of his way, and boarded the plane. The boarding door was shut behind Dixon with 33 of the intended 98 passengers on board. Once on board, Dixon pointed his gun at the head of 23-year-old stewardess, Carol Bollinger, and ordered the pilot, W. E. Buchanan, to fly to Havana. Buchanan had previously been the pilot of a 1961 flight that was hijacked to Cuba.

The plane was given immediate clearance to depart and took off at 9:29 a.m. During the flight, Dixon sat in the passenger area behind the cockpit with his gun pointed at Bollinger. Dixon claimed to be a convicted bank robber, a member of various extremist organizations, and an admirer of Angela Davis and Soledad Brother George Jackson.

After the plane landed in Havana, Dixon requested political asylum and was permitted to deboard. The plane was held in Havana for several hours. One of the passengers noted that the Cubans were hospitable, serving the passengers steak, French fries, and dessert. The jet departed from Havana at 4:15 p.m., landing in Miami 27 minutes later. None of the passengers or crew members was injured.

Dixon claimed to have married while in Cuba. Investigators were unable to determine how or when Dixon returned to the United States.

== Killing of Michael McAllister ==
More than four years after the hijacking, Dixon surfaced in western Michigan. At approximately 2:45 a.m. on January 9, 1976, Dixon was hitchhiking along North Shore Drive just north of South Haven's city limits in Casco Township, Allegan County. South Haven patrol officer Michael McAllister approached Dixon.

Dixon shot McAllister twice with a 9 millimeter handgun. McAllister, age 39 and the father of five children, died from his wounds at 4:05 a.m. at South Haven Community Hospital. Before losing consciousness, McAllister said he was seeking to search Dixon when he turned and shot him.

Another officer, Lt. Larry Bild, responded to the scene and witnessed the shooting. Dixon reportedly aimed his gun at the second officer but the clip fell to the ground. Dixon fled on foot and police tracked his footprints in fresh snow which ended at the basement door of a house owned by automobile dealer William Decker. Dixon was discovered in the basement and was arrested without further resistance.

The Federal Bureau of Investigation (FBI) confirmed that the man held for McAllister's murder was the same man wanted for the 1971 Eastern Airlines hijacking. The FBI also reported that they were unaware that Dixon had left Cuba.

A resident of the Sandbar Beach subdivision located north of South Haven reported that Dixon had been living for several weeks in a vacant, concrete-block cottage in the neighborhood.

== Trial and conviction for second degree murder ==
A preliminary hearing in the McAllister murder was held in Allegan County's 57th district court on January 21, 1976. The state presented testimony that police had tracked footprints from the murder scene to the house where Dixon was discovered, that Dixon admitted dropping a weapon while running, and that he possessed bullets matching the murder weapon when he was arrested. At the end of the hearing, Dixon was ordered to be held without bond.

Dixon's defense counsel filed a pre-trial motion to change venue contending that adverse publicity would make it impossible for him to receive a fair trial in the county where McAllister was killed. The motion was denied, but jury selection consumed two weeks to allow detailed questioning of potential jurors so as to exclude those who may have been prejudiced by pretrial publicity.

A pathologist testified at trial that McAllister sustained two gunshot wounds, one to the abdomen and the other to the lower back. He died from internal bleeding.

At trial, Dixon's lawyer stipulated that Dixon shot McAllister and contended that Dixon acted in self-defense. Dixon testified that a car pulled up behind him, and "a large man jumped out and grabbed me by the front of my coat." Dixon testified that the man then hit him in the face, possibly twice, and then grabbed him by the coat and threw him toward the car. At that point, Dixon said he turned and fired his gun. Dixon claimed that he feared for his life and could not tell in the dark that the vehicle was a police car or that the man who struck him was in uniform.

The defense also presented photographs taken at the time of Dixon's arrest showing that he had a black eye and bruises on the right side of his face. The defense also presented testimony that Dixon's face was not injured when he was at a bar earlier in the night. An Indiana University Ph.D. in optometry testified that, given the dark conditions and the fact that Dixon was wearing dark glasses, Dixon would have been unable immediately to identify McAllister as a police officer.

The jury returned its verdict on July 27, rejecting the prosecution's request for a conviction of first degree murder. The jury instead found Dixon guilty of second degree murder. In assessing the verdict, one newspaper noted that the jury was all white, as was Dixon, whereas the slain officer was black.

== Trial and conviction for air piracy and kidnapping ==
Dixon was arraigned in federal court in Detroit on March 30, 1976, on charges of air piracy (49 U.S.C. 1472(i)) and kidnapping (18 U.S.C. 1201(a)). Dixon "stood mute" at the arraignment.

At trial, which began on December 8, 1976, Dixon defended himself with the assistance of federal public defender Kenneth Sasse. Christopher Andreoff was the prosecutor. It was only the third or fourth hijacking case to go to trial in the United States.

Dixon claimed at trial that the charge was a case of mistaken identity, but the government presented testimony from 10 witness who identified Dixon as the person who hijacked the flight. At the end of a seven-day trial, the jury deliberated for only four hours and found Dixon guilty of both air piracy and kidnapping.

Dixon was sentenced by Judge Thomas P. Thornton on February 24, 1977, to serve 40 years in prison (consecutive 20-year sentences on each count). Dixon's service of the 40-year term was set to commence after he completed his life sentence on the state murder charge.

Dixon appealed the conviction to the Sixth Circuit Court of Appeals. Dixon advanced two arguments on appeal:

1. Dixon contended that the government violated the Interstate Agreement on Detainers (18 U.S.C. 1201(a)) by returning him from federal custody to Allergan County without final disposition of the federal charges. The Court of Appeals in a published decision issued in February 1979 concluded that there was no violation because Dixon's counsel had made a "written request for temporary custody" which was granted in order to accommodate defense counsel in conferring with Dixon.
2. Dixon further contended that the air piracy statute did not permit joinder and trial with kidnapping charges. The Court of Appeals found Dixon's argument to be inconsistent with Congressional intent, as kidnapping with interstate transportation of the victim is not a crime solely within the province of the states.

The Court of Appeals also found Dixon's other grounds for appeal to be without merit. Accordingly, the District Court's judgment of conviction was affirmed.

== Escape attempt and later years ==
In June 1982, Dixon and five other inmates attempted to escape from the Michigan State Prison at Jackson, Michigan. The men succeeded in scaling a 10-foot security fence but were detected before they could throw a rope over an outer security wall.

As of October 2012, Dixon remained in prison, being held at the Kinross Correctional Facility in the Upper Peninsula of Michigan.

Dixon was paroled in May 2021. Following his parole, he was transferred to the Federal Correctional Institution in Hazelton, West Virginia.

== See also ==
- List of homicides in Michigan
- List of Cuba–United States aircraft hijackings
