= Alejandro Iaccarino =

Argentine businessman (born 1946)

Alejandro Romulo Iaccarino
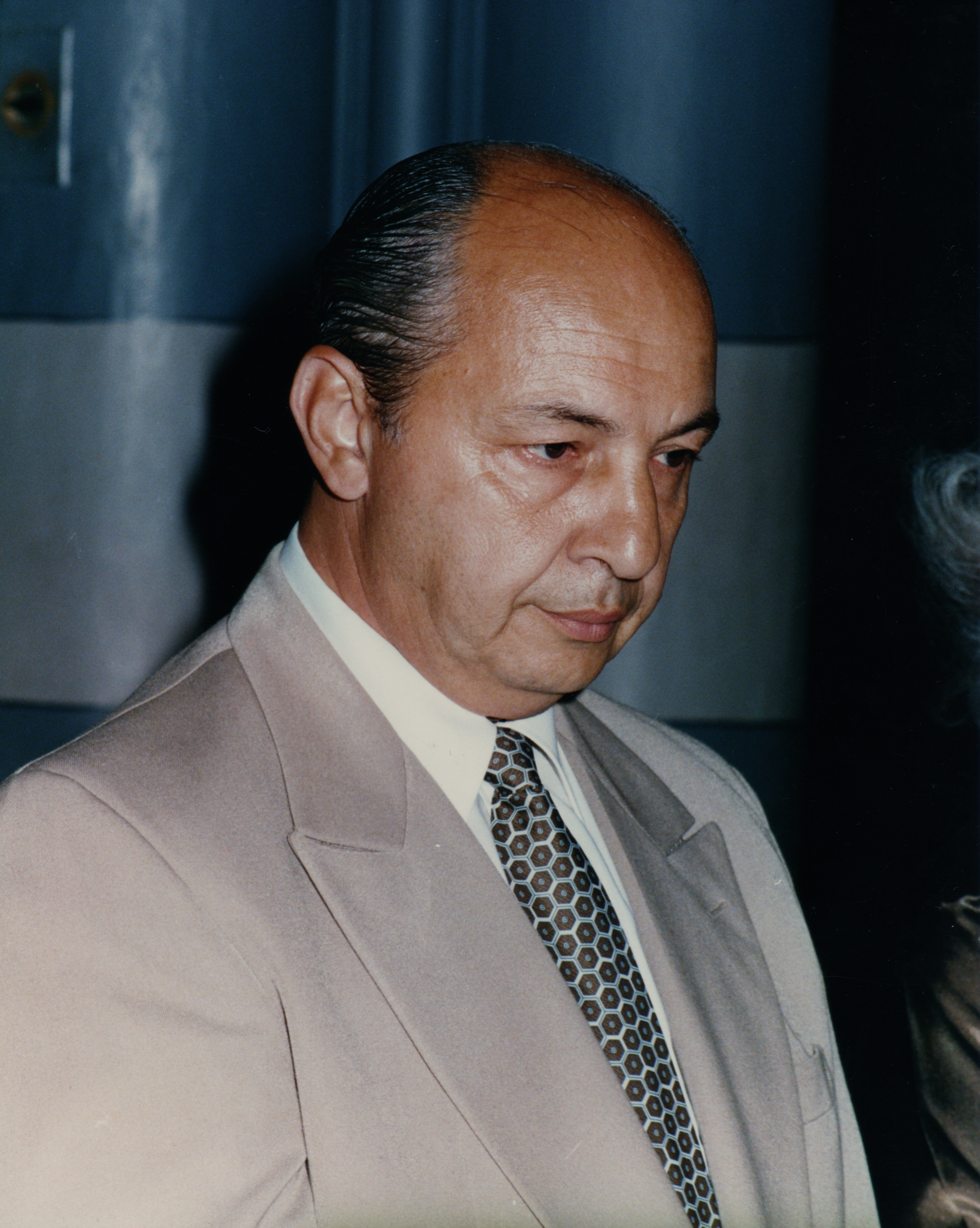
- Iaccarino in 1994
- Born: August 7, 1946 (age 80); La Plata, Buenos Aires, Argentina

Alejandro Romulo Iaccarino (born August 7, 1946) is an Argentine businessman. In 1976 Iaccarino, a successful dairy entrepreneur, was kidnapped with several relatives and detained by armed officials; he was released in 1978. Iaccarino founded several economic associations.

== Early life ==
Iaccarino was born in La Plata on August 7, 1946, the son of Dora Emma Venturino and Rodolfo Genaro Valentin Iaccarino. He has two brothers, Carlos and Rodolfo, and was married to Mercedes Rosario Ruiz.

== Career ==
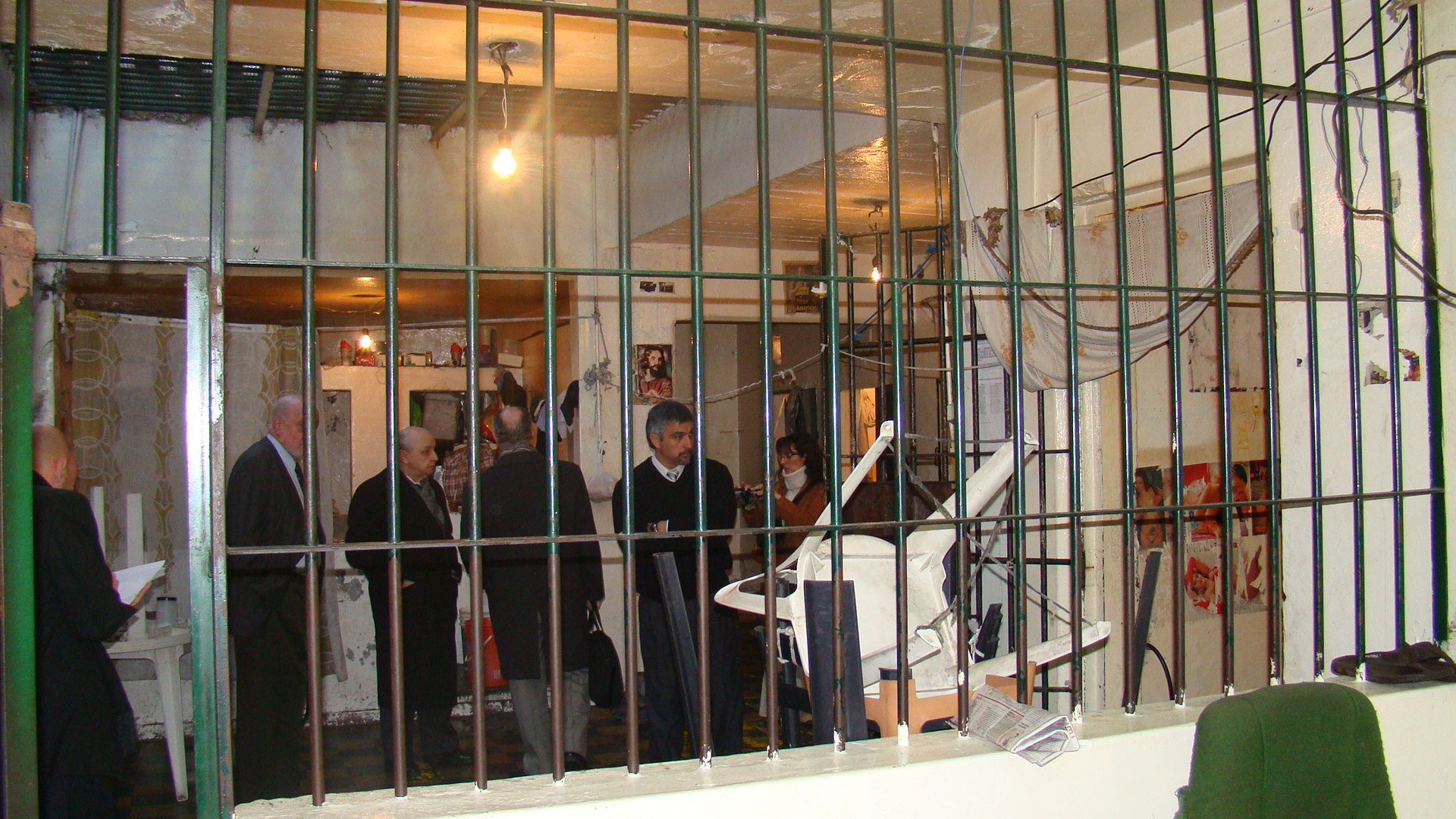
Mobile clandestine prison, known as "the hell", in 2013

In 1969, Iaccarino joined the Buenos Aires stock exchange as its youngest member. He founded Southern Argentina Construction, Llumbras and Ciatra. Iaccarino later purchased two livestock and forest holdings comprising 25,000 hectares (97 sq mi) in Santiago del Estero Province. In 1974, he and his brother Carlos traveled to the United States to research the use of wood by-products. The following year, Iaccarino confronted Santiago del Estero governor Carlos Juarez about governmental setting of milk prices (Iaccarino had founded the NOA dairy).

== Imprisonment by military dictatorship ==
In 1976 Iaccarino, his brothers and his parents were kidnapped by the military dictatorship so their assets could be seized. He and his brother, Carlos, were imprisoned until September 4, 1978.

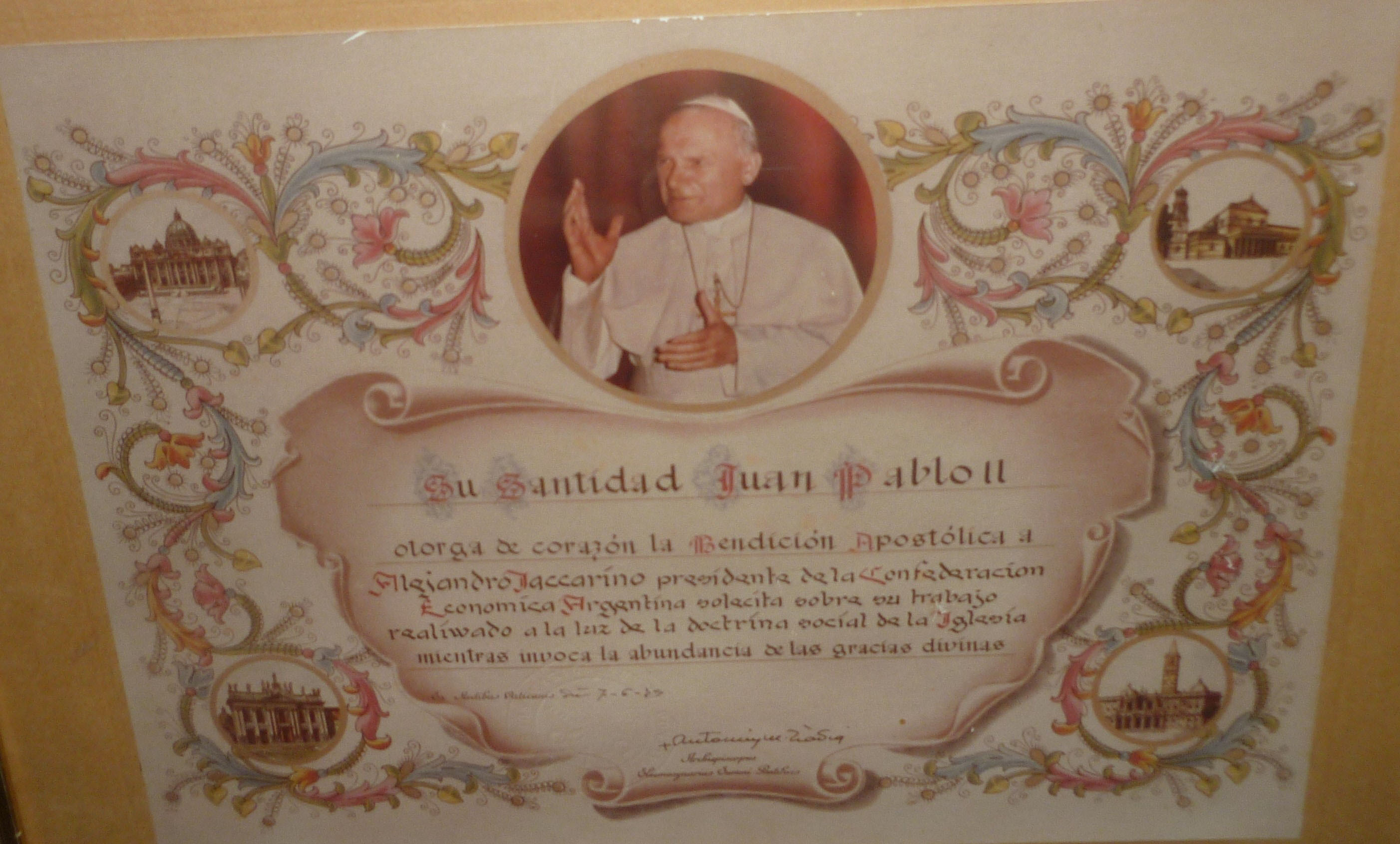
Apostolic Blessing from Pope John Paul II

== Activist and advisor ==
In 1982 Iaccarino was elected president of the Economic Confederation of Argentina, founding economic associations throughout the country with a group of businesspeople and professionals. This gave a voice to those who were kidnapped, tortured and economically harmed by the dictatorship.

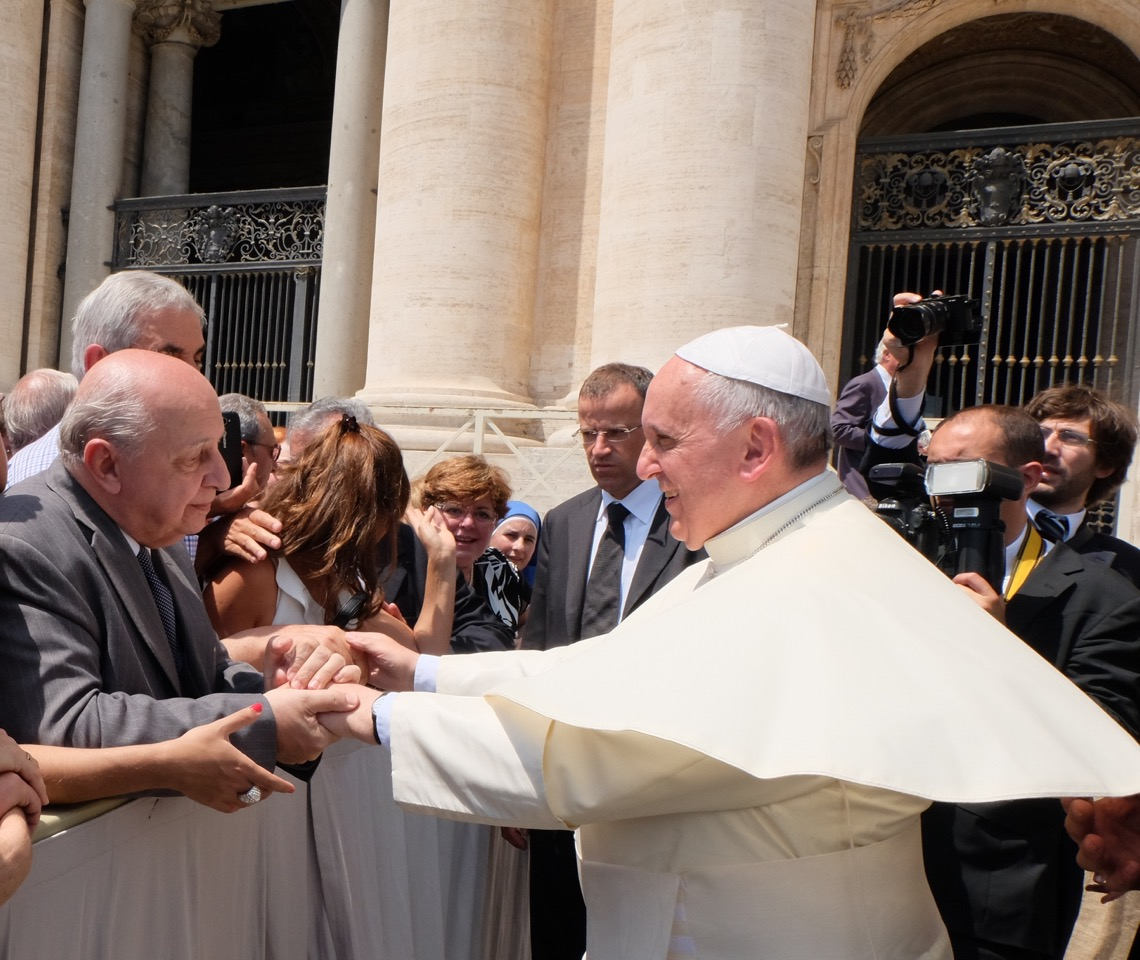
Emotional meeting with the Pope Francis in St. Peter's Square

For his presidency of the ECA and the creation of PEEG, Iaccarino received an Apostolic Blessing from Pope John Paul II on June 7, 1985. At a meeting of international representatives in the United States, he was appointed chairman of the Investigation Committee of the International Monetary Fund and the Trilateral Commission in Latin America. He maintains his friendship with 1980 Nobel Peace Prize laureate Adolfo Pérez Esquivel, with whom he was imprisoned in unit nine of the La Plata. In 1982, Iaccarino became a follower of former President of Argentina Arturo Frondizi until Frondizi's death in 1995.

== Present day ==
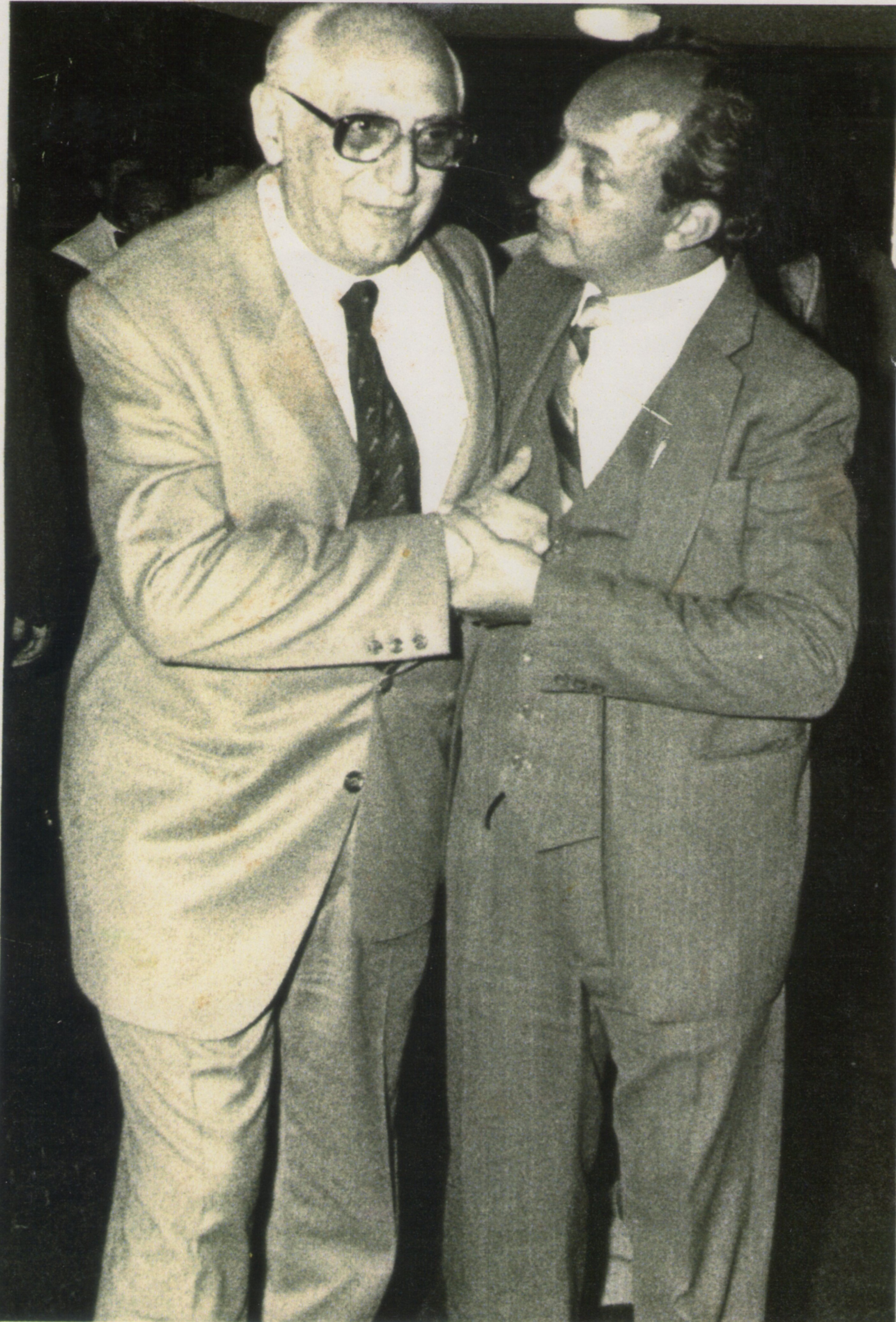
With Arturo Frondizi (left) at a General San Martín Partido event

After Iaccarino was freed, he attended conferences of Argentine economic associations in Buenos Aires, Quilmes, San Juan, Mendoza, Tucumán and Mar del Plata. For several years he has lectured in municipalities and universities around the country, such as UNICEN, UNLP and UNLZ, about life during the Argentine Revolution. On April 30, 2012, three men tried to assassinate Iaccarino at his home in La Plata.

== Books ==
With his brother Carlos, Iaccarino has written Father Forgive Them, For They Know Not What They Do (1998); Metanoia (2000); Secrets of World Power (2002), and The Forgotten Laws (2003).

== See also ==
- List of kidnappings

== Bibliography ==
- Muleiro, Vicente (2011). 1976. El golpe Civil. Planeta. ISBN 9789504925118.
- Verbitsky, Horacio (2013). Cuentas Pendientes. Los cómplices económicos de la dictadura. Siglo Veintiuno. ISBN 9789876293440.
- Perosino, María Celeste; Nápoli, Bruno; Bosisio, Walter Alberto (2013). Economía, Política y Sistema Financiero. La última dictadura cívico-militar en la CNV. Comisión Nacional de Valores. ISBN 9789874508607.
