= List of people who disappeared mysteriously (1970s) =

This is a list of people who disappeared mysteriously: 1970s or whose deaths or exact circumstances thereof are not substantiated. Many people who disappear end up declared presumed dead and some of these people were possibly subjected to forced disappearance.

This list is a general catch-all; for specialty lists, see Lists of people who disappeared.

== 1970 ==
Date	Person(s)	Age when disappeared	Missing from	Circumstances	Refs.
Early 1970	Akpan Utuk	Unknown	Lagos, Nigeria	Akpan Utuk was a colonel in the Biafran Army. He was last seen at a party in Lagos in early 1970 and is thought to be dead.	
12 January 1970	Cheryl Grimmer	3	Wollongong, Australia	Grimmer went missing from a beachside shower block. Initially, she had refused to leave the shower block, causing one of her brothers to go collect their mother to persuade Cheryl to come out. In the moments between his leaving the shower block and returning with his mother, Cheryl disappeared. Witnesses claim they saw a man in an orange swimsuit carrying a blonde-haired child wrapped up in a towel. On 23 March 2017, a man was arrested and charged with Grimmer's abduction and murder. However, the judge at the Supreme Court of New South Wales declared some of the evidence inadmissible in the case, and the charges against the suspect were dropped in February 2019.	
6 April 1970	Sean Flynn	28	Cambodia	Sean Flynn, the son of actor Errol Flynn and Lili Damita, and his colleague Dana Stone, disappeared on 6 April 1970 while working as freelance photojournalists for Time. Neither man's remains were ever found and they are generally assumed to have been killed by Khmer Rouge guerrillas. After a decade-long search financed by his mother, Flynn was officially declared dead in 1984. In 2010, a British team uncovered the remains of a Western hostage in the Cambodian jungle, but DNA comparisons with samples from the Flynn family were negative.	
6 April 1970	Dana Stone	30	Cambodia		
15 May 1970	Edward Andrews	61–62	Chicago, Illinois, U.S.	Edward Andrews and his wife Stephania disappeared after leaving a party in the Chicago Loop on 15 May 1970. Police theorized that the couple accidentally drove into the Chicago River, but multiple searches over a period of years failed to locate them or their vehicle.	
15 May 1970	Stephania Andrews	61–62	Chicago, Illinois, U.S.	Edward Andrews and his wife Stephania disappeared after leaving a party in the Chicago Loop on 15 May 1970. Police theorized that the couple accidentally drove into the Chicago River, but multiple searches over a period of years failed to locate them or their vehicle.	
18 June 1970	Muhammad Bassiri	28	El Aauin, Spanish Sahara	Bassiri, a Sahrawi nationalist leader and anti-colonialist activist, was detained and presumably executed by the Spanish Legion on 18 June 1970.	
20 August 1970	Flag Boshielo	49–50	Caprivi Strip, South West Africa	Flag Marutle Boshielo was a South African anti-apartheid activist, trade unionist, and communist who disappeared in the Caprivi Strip on 20 August 1970 during an unsuccessful MK operation after his contingent was ambushed. Boshielo had started serving as political commissar of the MK in 1969.	
16 September 1970	Mauro De Mauro	49	Palermo, Italy	De Mauro, an Italian investigative journalist, disappeared on 16 September 1970 and has not been seen since.	
13 October 1970	Helen Claire Frost	17	Prince George, British Columbia, Canada	Frost was reported missing by her sister on 15 October 1970, having failed to return home from a walk in Prince George, British Columbia two days earlier. Frost has not been seen since.	
15 November 1970	Robin Graham	18	Los Angeles, California, U.S.	After running out of gas on the Hollywood Freeway, Graham was last seen by California Highway Patrol officers on 15 November 1970. The officer directed her to a callbox and later saw her speaking with a man beside her car. The circumstances of her disappearance resulted in CHP policies being changed to ensure the safety of stranded female motorists.	

== 1971 ==
Date	Person(s)	Age when disappeared	Missing from	Circumstances	Refs.
Early 1971	Sada Abe	65–66	Chiba Prefecture, Japan	Sada Abe was a former geisha and prostitute infamous for the murder of her lover in the 1930s. Abe left a note behind at the hotel she worked at stating that "I'm just a no use girl" some time in 1971 and has since been unaccounted for.	
5 May 1971	A. B. M. Abdur Rahim	35	Pakistan	A. B. M. Abdur Rahim was a labour legal consultant, general secretary of the Pakistan Labour Federation, and manager of the Ujala Match Factory, who was abducted from the factory by Pakistani armed forces on 5 May 1971 and has been missing since.	
12 May 1971	Rakhal Chandra Das	38	Pakistan	Rakhal Chandra Das was a Bangladeshi physician who was kidnapped on 12 May 1971 by a Pakistan Army in a hospital where he was working during the Bangladesh Liberation War and was never seen again. He is believed to have been killed.	
23 May 1971	Lew Welch	44	Nevada City, U.S.	The poet Lew Welch, disappeared after leaving a note, and was believed to have committed suicide.	
14 October 1971	Jean Virginia Sampare	18	Gitsegukla, British Columbia, Canada	Sampare was last seen by her cousin on the Highway of Tears outside Gitsegukla on 14 October 1971. He left her alone when he went home to get a jacket or his bike, and she was gone when he returned.	
14 November 1971	Eileen McCarthy	23	Edmonton, Alberta, Canada	McCarthy, a 23-year-old medical laboratory scientist from Edmonton, Alberta, Canada, disappeared around 6:30 a.m. after waiting at a bus stop to go to work at the Misericordia Community Hospital, where she was last seen alive. She was never seen again, and her disappearance remains the longest disappearance in Edmonton history.	
6 December 1971	Peter Christy	33–34	Near Jamnagar, India	Christy, a PAF bomber pilot and navigator, was tasked with destroying an air station belonging to the Indian Air Force, but was presumably shot down by a Surface-to-air missile.	
7 December 1971	Jamie Rochelle Grissim	16	Vancouver, Washington, U.S.	A student at the Fort Vancouver High School who went missing while walking home from school. Initially considered a runaway by authorities, foul play was suspected when her identification, purse, and other personal possessions were discovered approximately 20 miles from where she was last seen alive. She is suspected of being a victim of serial killer Warren Forrest.	
8 December 1971	A. K. M. Miraj Uddin	23	Dhaka, Bangladesh	A. K. M. Miraj Uddin was a Bangladeshi athlete, freedom fighter, and politician who disappeared after being released from the Dhaka Central Jail and taken in a jeep on 8 December 1971, and has not been seen since.	
10 December 1971	Lynne Schulze	17	Middlebury, Vermont, U.S.	Schulze was a student at Middlebury College and was last seen by one of her college friends when she abruptly turned back on the way to a literature exam, claiming she had left her favorite pen in her dorm room. Her wallet, checkbook, and other belongings were found at the dorm. A subsequent report said that she was seen a short time later outside a health-food store co-owned and operated at that time by Robert Durst and his wife Kathleen, who herself disappeared a decade later. Schulze had also been seen buying prunes from the same store earlier in the day.	
14 December 1971	Shahidullah Kaiser	44	Dhaka, Bangladesh	Kaiser, a Bangladeshi writer and novelist who was awarded multiple awards during different decades, disappeared on 14 December 1971 and is believed to have been killed.	

== 1972 ==
Date	Person(s)	Age when disappeared	Missing from	Circumstances	Refs.
1972	Brendan Simbwaye	47–48	Caprivi, Namibia	Brendan Simbwaye was an anti-apartheid Namibian activist and high ranking politician, who mysteriously disappeared in Caprivi in 1972. It has been claimed that the South African security forces had murdered Simbwaye, but this has never been proven to be true.	
4 January 1972	Belinda Hutchens	22	Wilton Manors, Florida	A cocktail waitress who disappeared and was never seen again.	
30 January 1972	Zahir Raihan	36	Bangladesh	Zahir Raihan, a Bangladeshi novelist, writer, and filmmaker and the brother of Shahidullah Kaiser, disappeared on 30 January 1972, while looking for his brother, who had been abducted by Pakistani forces.	
29 February 1972	Debora Sue Lowe	13	Broward County, Florida	A schoolgirl who disappeared and was never seen again.	
19 March 1972	Bonnie Taylor	20	Wilton Manors, Florida	Bonnie Taylor disappeared after a speeding violation and was never seen again.	
12 June 1972	Adrien McNaughton	5	Arnprior, Ontario, Canada	McNaughton wandered away from his family during a fishing trip on 12 June 1972 and has not been seen since.	
21 June 1972	Boanerges de Souza Massa	34	Formosa, Brazil	The Brazilian physician and field surgeon for the ALN was captured, tortured and likely murdered by Brazilian authorities. His body has never been recovered.	
August 31, 1972	Elizabeth Renée Wilt	22	Florida	An Arkansas native last known to have travelled to Florida to attend the 1972 Republican National Convention. Her body has never been found.	
August 1972	Joseph Lynskey	40	Belfast	A veteran IRA member who disappeared amid an internal IRA feud in August 1972 and has not been seen since.	
29 October 1972	Jamal Al-Gashey	18–19	Libya	One of three surviving perpetrators of the Munich massacre, Al-Gashey was released in a prisoner exchange and given refuge in Libya. Although Al-Gashey provided an interview on condition of anonymity as to his whereabouts in 1999, his current whereabouts are unknown.	

== 1973 ==
Date	Person(s)	Age when disappeared	Missing from	Circumstances	Refs.
1973	Vladimir Chávez	c. 33	Chile	A Chilean primary school teacher and politician of the Communist Party. Chávez disappeared following a coup in 1973. His ultimate fate remains unknown.	
c. 1973	Zazu Nova	c. 24	New York, U.S.	A gay liberation activist and founding member of Gay Youth. Nova disappeared on an unknown date shortly after the disbanding of the Gay Liberation Front. The precise circumstances of Nova's disappearance are unknown.	
c. 1973	Renee Armbrust	Unknown	Golden, Colorado, U.S.	Armbrust was the wife of a man whose body was found near Grant, Colorado; he was later identified as Anthony John Armbrust III. It is believed that Armbrust and her husband had signed a suicide pact, and authorities believe her to be deceased.	
24 March 1973	James Allen da Luz	34	Porto Alegre, Rio Grande do Sul, Brazil	James Allen da Luz was a Brazilian guerrilla who disappeared on 24 March 1973 from Porto Alegre, Rio Grande do Sul, Brazil as he has not been seen since. He is believed to be dead.	
c. 25 April 1973	Ray Robinson	35	South Dakota, U.S.	Robinson was an African-American civil rights activist who disappeared around 25 April 1973 during the Wounded Knee Protests on the Pine Ridge Indian Reservation in South Dakota. In 2014, the FBI said it had concluded from witness statements that Robinson was killed by American Indian Movement militants and he was "buried in the hills". His body has never been located.	
21 May 1973	Christine Markham	9	Scunthorpe, England	Christine Markham was an English girl who was last seen walking to school. Markham's body has never been found. Several individuals, including serial child killers Robert Black and Joseph Kappen, have been questioned about potential involvement in Markham's abduction, but her disappearance remains unsolved.	
9 June 1973	Jason Shannon	11 months	Elizabeth West, South Australia, Australia	Australian baby Jason was abducted by his father Barry Shannon at his grandparents' home in Elizabeth West, Adelaide; Barry died in a vehicle collision shortly thereafter. He has not been seen since, and police believe that he was either murdered or given to a relative of Barry to be raised in secret.	
26 July 1973	Janice Kathryn Pockett	7	Tolland, Connecticut, U.S.	Janice Kathryn Pockett was an American girl who disappeared after leaving her home in Tolland, Connecticut on 26 July 1973 and has not been seen since.	
25 August 1973	Joanne Ratcliffe	11	Adelaide, Australia	Ratcliffe and Gordon are two Australian girls who went missing while attending an Australian rules football match at the Adelaide Oval on 25 August 1973.	
25 August 1973	Kirste Gordon	4	Adelaide, Australia	Ratcliffe and Gordon are two Australian girls who went missing while attending an Australian rules football match at the Adelaide Oval on 25 August 1973.	

== 1974 ==
Date	Person(s)	Age when disappeared	Missing from	Circumstances	Refs.
26 January and 19 November 1974	Guðmundur Einarsson	18	Hafnarfjörður, Iceland	Six people were convicted of their alleged murders on the basis of confessions extracted by the police. On 27 September 2018, 44 years later, the Supreme Court of Iceland acquitted five of the six original suspects.	
26 January and 19 November 1974	Geirfinnur Einarsson	32	Keflavík, Iceland	Six people were convicted of their alleged murders on the basis of confessions extracted by the police. On 27 September 2018, 44 years later, the Supreme Court of Iceland acquitted five of the six original suspects.	
5 March 1974	Amy Billig	17	Coconut Grove, Florida, U.S.	17-year-old Amy Billig disappeared in Coconut Grove, a neighborhood in Miami, Florida, on 5 March 1974. She had been headed to her father's art gallery to borrow money before meeting a friend for lunch, though never arrived. Billig is believed to have been abducted, drugged, raped, and murdered by members of the Pagan's Motorcycle Club.	
5 May 1974	John Colonna	12	Puerto Rico	The two child siblings disappeared in Puerto Rico on 5 May 1974 and were never seen again. Their ultimate fate is unknown.	
5 May 1974	Gianinna Colonna	11	Puerto Rico	The two child siblings disappeared in Puerto Rico on 5 May 1974 and were never seen again. Their ultimate fate is unknown.	
27 May 1974	Oscar Zeta Acosta	39	Mazatlán, Mexico	Acosta was a Mexican-American attorney and friend of the American author Hunter S. Thompson. Acosta is referred to as "Dr Gonzo" in Thompson's 1971 roman à clef Fear and Loathing in Las Vegas. On 27 May 1974, Acosta disappeared while traveling in Mexico after telling his son Marco he was about to leave Mazatlán on a "boat full of white snow", presumably an allusion to cocaine. Marco later said that although his body was never found, he surmises that probably, knowing the people he was involved with, he ended up mouthing off, getting into a fight, and getting killed.	
29 May 1974	Diane Gilchrist	14	Vancouver, Washington, U.S.	A Shumway Junior High School student. The circumstances surrounding her disappearance initially led police to suspect she had run away from home; her ultimate fate remains unclear, although investigators now suspect her of being a victim of serial killer Warren Forrest.	
11 June 1974	Georgann Hawkins	18	Seattle, Washington, U.S.	Hawkins, a University of Washington student, vanished in an alleyway behind her sorority house. Notorious serial killer Ted Bundy admitted to her supposed murder and that her remains had been recovered along with those of other victims, but these claims have never been verified.	
24 June 1974	Margaret Ellen Fox	14	Burlington, New Jersey, U.S.	Fox was a teenage girl who disappeared on 24 June 1974 from Burlington, New Jersey for unknown reasons and has not been seen since. It is believed by some people that she was kidnapped.	
22 July 1974	Pavlos Kouroupis	44–45	Kyrenia, Cyprus	Kouroupis was an officer in the Hellenic Army. At the time of the Turkish invasion of Cyprus in 1974, he was a lieutenant colonel and commanding officer of the 251st Battalion of the Cypriot National Guard, the unit closest to the Turkish landing site. With his unit, he opposed the Turkish army at the Battle of Pentemili beachhead, stalling its advance for two days. Kouroupis was last seen on 22 July 1974. Following the conclusion of the battle, the fate of Kouroupis is unknown.	
30 July 1974	Ofelio Lazo	43	Chile	A Chilean political dissident who disappeared on July 30, 1974. He is strongly believed to have been murdered.	
August 1974	Connie Converse	50	Ann Arbor, Michigan, U.S.	Converse was a singer-songwriter who was active in the New York City folk-music scene of the 1950s. In 1974, two years after losing her job as managing editor of the Journal of Conflict Resolution, Converse wrote letters to friends and family expressing her intention to start a new life. In August 1974, she loaded her Volkswagen Beetle with her belongings, drove away, and was never heard from again.	
29 August 1974	Jimmy Taylor	12	Derby, Western Australia, Australia	Jimmy, a 12-year-old Australian boy, was last seen entering a dark-coloured vehicle near a local store in Derby, Western Australia. A coronial inquest named convicted murderer James Ryan O'Neill as a possible person of interest.	
24 September 1974	Eduardo Aliste González	19	Santiago, Chile	González was arrested by the National Intelligence Directorate as part of an operation targeting Socialist Party militants at age 19 on 24 September 1974. He has not been seen since.	
18 November 1974	Diana Arón	24	Villa Grimaldi, Chile	Arón was a Chilean journalist and left-wing activist who was kidnapped on 18 November 1974 by agents of the DINA (the Chilean secret police during Pinochet's military dictatorship) and taken to Villa Grimaldi, where she was tortured by Miguel Krassnoff and presumably murdered. Her body was never recovered.	
29 November 1974	Carmen Bueno	24	Villa Grimaldi, Chile	The actress Bueno and the cinematographer Müller, both Chilean, were interrogated and tortured by DINA agents at Villa Grimaldi shortly before they were forcibly disappeared on 29 November 1974.	
29 November 1974	Jorge Müller	27	Villa Grimaldi, Chile	The actress Bueno and the cinematographer Müller, both Chilean, were interrogated and tortured by DINA agents at Villa Grimaldi shortly before they were forcibly disappeared on 29 November 1974.	
4 December 1974	Laurie Lynn Partridge	17	Spokane, Washington	Laurie Lynn Partridge disappeared after walking home from high school and was never seen again.	
23 December 1974	Rachel Trlica	17	Fort Worth, Texas, U.S.	Trlica took her friends, Wilson and Moseley, on a Christmas shopping trip to Fort Worth's Seminary South Shopping Center. The girls' abandoned car was discovered in the Sears lot, but the three girls' whereabouts are unknown.	
23 December 1974	Renee Wilson	14	Fort Worth, Texas, U.S.	Trlica took her friends, Wilson and Moseley, on a Christmas shopping trip to Fort Worth's Seminary South Shopping Center. The girls' abandoned car was discovered in the Sears lot, but the three girls' whereabouts are unknown.	
23 December 1974	Julie Ann Moseley	9	Fort Worth, Texas, U.S.	Trlica took her friends, Wilson and Moseley, on a Christmas shopping trip to Fort Worth's Seminary South Shopping Center. The girls' abandoned car was discovered in the Sears lot, but the three girls' whereabouts are unknown.	

== 1975 ==
Date	Person(s)	Age when disappeared	Missing from	Circumstances	Refs.
6 March 1975	Jim Sullivan	35	New Mexico, U.S.	Sullivan, an American singer-songwriter, left Los Angeles on 4 March 1975 to drive to Nashville, Tennessee. His abandoned car was found at a remote ranch in New Mexico, and he was reportedly last seen walking away from it on 6 March. The car contained Sullivan's money, papers, guitar, clothes, and a box of his unsold records.	
31 May 1975	Mona Blades	18	North Island, New Zealand	Blades disappeared on 31 May 1975 while hitchhiking on the North Island near Rotorua. She is believed to have been murdered, but no remains have ever been discovered.	
1 July 1975	Eamon Molloy	21	Belfast	Molloy was abducted by the Provisional Irish Republican Army on 1 July 1975. The IRA accused Molloy of being an informant and his remains were recovered on 28 May 1999.	
2 July 1975	William Beausire	26	Santiago, Chile	A British-Chilean abducted by DINA agents at Ministro Pistarini International Airport, Buenos Aires, in November 1974. Returned to Chile, Beausire was held in various DINA detention centres before his enforced disappearance in Santiago on 2 July 1975 at age 26.	
4 July 1975	Juanita Nielsen	38	Sydney, Australia	Nielsen, an Australian publisher, activist, and heiress, disappeared in Kings Cross, Sydney, on 4 July 1975. She was presumed murdered, but no one has been convicted of the crime, and her remains have never been found.	
30 July 1975	Jimmy Hoffa	62	Bloomfield Township, Michigan, U.S.	Hoffa, a U.S. trade union leader and president of the International Brotherhood of Teamsters, disappeared on 30 July 1975 from the parking lot of a restaurant. It is believed he was to meet with the Mafia leaders Anthony Giacalone and Anthony Provenzano.	
October 1975	Fritz Stammberger	35	Tirich Mir, Pakistan	Stammberger, a German mountaineer, disappeared in October 1975 while scouting an expedition of Tirich Mir. It is believed he may have joined the mujahideen and died in the early 1980s in Afghanistan.	
1 November 1975	Tish Pascual-Ladlad	25	Philippines	Pascual-Ladlad, a UPLB student journalist and first female editor-in-chief of the Aggie Green and Gold, was abducted and presumably killed during the Marcos dictatorship.	
c. 1975–1976	Norodom Chantaraingsey	49–52	Cambodia	Chantaraingsey, a member of the Cambodian royal family and a Cambodian nationalist, was initially a leader of the guerrilla resistance against the colonial French, but was presumably killed in 1975 or 1976 while fighting the Khmer Rouge.	

== 1976 ==
Date	Person(s)	Age when disappeared	Missing from	Circumstances	Refs.
1976	Norodom Naradipo	30	Cambodia	Naradipo, a Cambodian prince, disappeared mysteriously in 1976. Many years later, however, there were rumors that he was still alive. Several people claimed to be the missing prince, but they were all later proven to be false.	
1976	Norodom Kantol	55–56	Cambodia	Kantol, a former prime minister of Cambodia who was the first to rule for more than two years, disappeared in 1976, presumably killed by the Khmer Rouge.	
12 January 1976	Eloise Worledge	8	Beaumaris, Australia	Worledge disappeared from her home and is thought to have been abducted from her bedroom.	
29 February 1976	Willi Koeppen	46	Olinda, Victoria, Australia	Willi Koeppen is a German Australian chef who disappeared on 29 February 1976 from Olinda, Victoria, Australia and has not been seen since.	
18 March 1976	Francisco Tenório Júnior	34	Buenos Aires, Argentina	Tenório Júnior, a Brazilian musician and composer, disappeared mysteriously while on tour in Argentina in March 1976. A decade after his disappearance, an Argentinian military colonel came forward and claimed that Tenório Júnior had been mistaken for a guerrilla, abducted, tortured and subsequently killed, yet this claim has never been confirmed.	
23 April 1976	Sandy Davidson	3	Irvine, Scotland	The Scottish boy Sandy Davidson disappeared while he was playing in the back garden of his house in the Bourtreehill housing estate.	
26 May 1976	Juan Maino	Unknown	Ñuñoa, Chile	Maino, a photographer, political activist and leader of the Popular Unitary Action Movement, was detained by DINA agents for opposing Augusto Pinochet's regime. He and several others were transported to a secret government facility, and have not been seen since.	
1 July 1976	Hanna Mikhail	41	Lebanon	Prior to his disappearance on 1 July 1976, Mikhail was a Palestinian scholar and a Fatah member, and he was sent by Yasser Arafat to a refuge camp in Tripoli to investigate the conflicts that was ongoing then. The boat boarded by Mikhail, nine PLO members and two sailors went missing since its departure, and the 12 men, including Mikhail, were never found, although unconfirmed theories suggested that Mikhail was secretly detained by either Syrian or the Phalange forces, or that he was murdered by the Syrians.	
21 August 1976	Andy Puglisi	10	Lawrence, Massachusetts, U.S.	Puglisi wandered away from a pool area near his home in Lawrence, Massachusetts and has not been seen since.	
27 September 1976	María Emilia Islas	23	Buenos Aires, Argentina	Islas, a Uruguayan political activist, disappeared together with her husband, after they were arrested for being suspected militants by Uruguayan intelligence services. Neither has been located, and both remain missing to this day.	
15 December 1976	Jussi Kivimäki	91	Finland	Jussi Kivimäki was a professional Greco-Roman light heavyweight wrestler who competed at the 1908 Summer Olympics. After disappearing on 15 December 1976, he was declared dead in absentia, with his date of death being recorded as sometime around 1 January 1976.	

== 1977 ==
Date	Person(s)	Age when disappeared	Missing from	Circumstances	Refs.
1977	Héctor Oesterheld	58	Buenos Aires, Argentina	Oesterheld, an Argentine journalist and writer of comics as well as graphic novels, also known simply as "HGO", disappeared in 1977 and is believed to have been kidnapped and has not been seen since.	
17 February 1977	Helen Brach	65	Rochester, Minnesota, U.S.	Brach, an heiress, disappeared on 17 February 1977, and was thought to have been murdered. A man named Richard Bailey was charged more than a decade later with killing Brach, but not convicted. He eventually received a long sentence after being convicted of defrauding her.	
18 March 1977	Mary Boyle	6	Ballyshannon, Ireland	Boyle disappeared while walking back to her grandparents' rural farmhouse. The investigation into her death has been criticized by some parts of her family and former police officers have stated that they believe Boyle was killed. Boyle is Ireland's longest-running missing child case.	
15 July 1977	Donald Mackay	43	New South Wales, Australia	An Australian anti-drug campaigner, Mackay may have been murdered after providing information to police that resulted in what was then the biggest drug bust in Australian history.	
31 July 1977	Gerry Faustino	21	Makati, Philippines	Filipino activists from the University of the Philippines Los Baños who were best known as some of the most prominent desaparecidos of the Marcos Martial Law era in the Philippines were abducted on 31 July 1977 and have not been seen since.	
31 July 1977	Jessica Sales	25	Makati, Philippines	Filipino activists from the University of the Philippines Los Baños who were best known as some of the most prominent desaparecidos of the Marcos Martial Law era in the Philippines were abducted on 31 July 1977 and have not been seen since.	
31 July 1977	Rizalina Ilagan	23	Makati, Philippines	Filipino activists from the University of the Philippines Los Baños who were best known as some of the most prominent desaparecidos of the Marcos Martial Law era in the Philippines were abducted on 31 July 1977 and have not been seen since.	
31 July 1977	Cristina Catalla	26	Makati, Philippines	Filipino activists from the University of the Philippines Los Baños who were best known as some of the most prominent desaparecidos of the Marcos Martial Law era in the Philippines were abducted on 31 July 1977 and have not been seen since.	
19 September 1977	Yutaka Kume	52	Ushitsu, Ishikawa Prefecture, Japan	Yutaka Kume disappeared from Ishikawa Prefecture in 1977. In 2003, the Japanese Government issued an arrest warrant for Kim Se-ho, a North Korean agent, for his role in the abduction. North Korea denies any involvement in his disappearance, nor his entry to the country ever happening.	
21 October 1977	Kyoko Matsumoto	29	Yonago, Tottori Prefecture, Japan	Matsumoto left her home to go to a weaving class at around 8PM of 21 October 1977. Later that night she was seen talking with 2 suspicious men, who promptly punched the witness when they were asked what they were doing. Matsumoto was never seen again. She has been listed as one of the victims of North Korean abduction by the Japanese Government in 2006.	
15 November 1977	Megumi Yokota	13	Niigata Prefecture, Japan	Yokota was reportedly abducted by a North Korean agent on 15 November 1977. She was thought to have been taken to a spy-training center.	

== 1978 ==
Date	Person(s)	Age when disappeared	Missing from	Circumstances	Refs.
26 January 1978	Peter Winston	19	New York City, U.S.	Winston, an American chess player, disappeared under mysterious circumstances on 26 January 1978.	
24 February 1978	Gary Mathias	25	Chico, California U.S.	Mathias, of Yuba City, California, is the only one of a group of five men who disappeared after buying junk food and snacks at a Chico market on the night of 24 February 1978, but who has not been found. Their car was found several days later on a winding dirt road high in the Sierra Nevada; why they were there, well off their route home, and why they abandoned a car that was apparently in good working order, is not known. In June of that year, the remains of three were found in the woods where they had died of exposure; a fourth was found in a trailer 20 miles (32 km) from the car, where he had starved to death after suffering severe frostbite, despite the availability of food, heat, and warmer clothing. Mathias, too, is believed to have made it to that trailer, but left it at some point.	
2 March 1978	Mary Leah Rodermund	16	Morgan City, Louisiana, U.S.	Mary Leah Rodermund disappeared on 2 March 1978 in Morgan City, Louisiana after going to a store and is known to have been abducted as her parents were called by both her abductor and her. She was never located.	
April 1978	John Brisker	30	Uganda	Brisker, an American professional basketball player from Detroit, Michigan, disappeared in Uganda in April 1978.	
21 May 1978	Anocha Panjoy	22	Macau	Panjoy was a Thai national who was abducted by North Korean agents from Macau on 21 May 1978. Her case only became known after the release of the American Charles Robert Jenkins and his Japanese family in 2004.	
1 June 1978	Yaeko Taguchi	22	Tokyo, Japan	Taguchi, a Japanese citizen, is said to have been kidnapped by North Korea in June 1978 and has not been seen since.	
6 June 1978	Minoru Tanaka	28	Narita Airport, Japan	Tanaka was a staff at a Chinese restaurant in Kobe who was taken to North Korea via Vienna and Moscow by North Korean agents, including the manager of the restaurant Tanaka worked at.	
25 June 1978	Trudie Adams	19	Newport, Australia	Adams disappeared from Newport Surf Life Saving Club in the early hours of 25 June 1978 after attending a dance, and has not been seen since.	
3 July 1978	Aleida "Leidy" Kaspersma	26	Kenmare, County Kerry, Ireland	Leidy Kaspersma, a Dutch national, mysteriously vanished from Kenmare. In 2026, investigative findings raised a theory that Kaspersma may have been targeted and abducted by North Korea as part of its state-sponsored kidnapping program to train espionage operatives.	
12 August 1978	Shuichi Ichikawa	23	Fukiage, Kagoshima, Japan	Ichikawa and Masumoto both went out to see the sunset at Fukiage Beach but were abducted at the beach. North Korea has claimed that the two had died within a few years after they were last seen in 1978, but the claim has not been substantiated.	
12 August 1978	Rumiko Masumoto	24	Fukiage, Kagoshima, Japan	Ichikawa and Masumoto both went out to see the sunset at Fukiage Beach but were abducted at the beach. North Korea has claimed that the two had died within a few years after they were last seen in 1978, but the claim has not been substantiated.	
12 August 1978	Miyoshi Soga	46	Sado Island, Japan	Miyoshi Soga was abducted by North Korean agents with her daughter, Hitomi, on 12 August 1978. While Hitomi returned to Japan in 2002, Miyoshi remains unaccounted for, with North Korea denying Miyoshi ever entered North Korea. In spite of this, the Japanese Government has issued an arrest warrant for Kim Myong-Suk, a North Korean agent, for his involvement in their abduction.	
19 August 1978	Genette Tate	13	Aylesbeare, England	Tate, a teenage English girl, disappeared on 19 August 1978 while delivering newspapers.	
20 August 1978	Melvin "Ricky" Pittman	17	Newark, New Jersey, U.S.	Collectively known as the "Clinton Avenue Five", they disappeared under unclear circumstances in 1978. In November 2008, Philander Hampton confessed that he and his cousin had killed them for supposedly stealing marijuana from his house, shooting them at gunpoint and then burning the bodies. Hampton was convicted and sentenced to 10 years imprisonment, but his victims' remains have never been found.	
20 August 1978	Ernest Taylor	17	Newark, New Jersey, U.S.	Collectively known as the "Clinton Avenue Five", they disappeared under unclear circumstances in 1978. In November 2008, Philander Hampton confessed that he and his cousin had killed them for supposedly stealing marijuana from his house, shooting them at gunpoint and then burning the bodies. Hampton was convicted and sentenced to 10 years imprisonment, but his victims' remains have never been found.	
20 August 1978	Alvin Turner	16	Newark, New Jersey, U.S.	Collectively known as the "Clinton Avenue Five", they disappeared under unclear circumstances in 1978. In November 2008, Philander Hampton confessed that he and his cousin had killed them for supposedly stealing marijuana from his house, shooting them at gunpoint and then burning the bodies. Hampton was convicted and sentenced to 10 years imprisonment, but his victims' remains have never been found.	
20 August 1978	Randy Johnson	16	Newark, New Jersey, U.S.	Collectively known as the "Clinton Avenue Five", they disappeared under unclear circumstances in 1978. In November 2008, Philander Hampton confessed that he and his cousin had killed them for supposedly stealing marijuana from his house, shooting them at gunpoint and then burning the bodies. Hampton was convicted and sentenced to 10 years imprisonment, but his victims' remains have never been found.	
20 August 1978	Michael McDowell	16	Newark, New Jersey, U.S.	Collectively known as the "Clinton Avenue Five", they disappeared under unclear circumstances in 1978. In November 2008, Philander Hampton confessed that he and his cousin had killed them for supposedly stealing marijuana from his house, shooting them at gunpoint and then burning the bodies. Hampton was convicted and sentenced to 10 years imprisonment, but his victims' remains have never been found.	
20 August 1978	Diana Ng Kum Yim	24	Singapore	The five women were social escorts who were invited to a party on a ship on the day of their disappearance. It is speculated that they could be victims of a transnational prostitution ring or human trafficking syndicate, or could be kidnapped by North Korean agents.	
20 August 1978	Yeng Yoke Fun	22	Singapore	The five women were social escorts who were invited to a party on a ship on the day of their disappearance. It is speculated that they could be victims of a transnational prostitution ring or human trafficking syndicate, or could be kidnapped by North Korean agents.	
20 August 1978	Yap Me Leng	22	Singapore	The five women were social escorts who were invited to a party on a ship on the day of their disappearance. It is speculated that they could be victims of a transnational prostitution ring or human trafficking syndicate, or could be kidnapped by North Korean agents.	
20 August 1978	Seetoh Tai Thim	19	Singapore	The five women were social escorts who were invited to a party on a ship on the day of their disappearance. It is speculated that they could be victims of a transnational prostitution ring or human trafficking syndicate, or could be kidnapped by North Korean agents.	
20 August 1978	Margaret Ong Guat Choo	19	Singapore	The five women were social escorts who were invited to a party on a ship on the day of their disappearance. It is speculated that they could be victims of a transnational prostitution ring or human trafficking syndicate, or could be kidnapped by North Korean agents.	
31 August 1978	Musa al-Sadr	50	Libya	Musa al-Sadr and two aides, Mohammed Yaaqoub and Abbas Badreddine(fr) disappeared six days after entering Libya on 31 August, during an official visit from Iranians from Lebanon at the invitation of the Libyan leader Muammar Gaddafi.	
31 August 1978	Mohammed Yaaqoub	Unknown	Libya	Musa al-Sadr and two aides, Mohammed Yaaqoub and Abbas Badreddine(fr) disappeared six days after entering Libya on 31 August, during an official visit from Iranians from Lebanon at the invitation of the Libyan leader Muammar Gaddafi.	
31 August 1978	Abbas Badreddine	Unknown	Libya	Musa al-Sadr and two aides, Mohammed Yaaqoub and Abbas Badreddine(fr) disappeared six days after entering Libya on 31 August, during an official visit from Iranians from Lebanon at the invitation of the Libyan leader Muammar Gaddafi.	
30 September 1978	Andrew John Amato	4	Webster, Massachusetts, U.S.	Andrew John Amato was an American boy who disappeared from the woods in Webster, Massachusetts while he was playing on 30 September 1978 and has not been seen since.	
21 October 1978	Frederick Valentich	20	Bass Strait, Australia	Frederick Valentich disappeared on 21 October 1978 during a solo flight near Bass Strait after reporting to an air traffic controller that his plane was being circled by an unknown craft.	
14 December 1978	Christie Farni	6	Medford, Oregon, U.S.	Farni disappeared en route to her elementary school after testifying against her father before a grand jury regarding physical-abuse allegations against him. Serial killer Henry Lee Lucas at one point implicated himself in Farni's disappearance and alleged murder, but her whereabouts remain unknown.	
31 December 1978	Danielle Judic	26	Belle-Île-en-Mer, France	Danielle Judic, a pharmacist, disappeared after attending a New Year's Eve party along with her car.	
1978	Sattar Jabr Naser	c. 20–28?	Iraq	Naser, an Iraqi writer, disappeared in 1978, and has not been seen since.	

== 1979 ==
Date	Person(s)	Age when disappeared	Missing from	Circumstances	Refs.
c. 1979	Jim Robinson	54	Miami, Florida, U.S.	Robinson, a former professional boxer notable for his bout with Cassius Clay (the future Muhammad Ali) in 1961, was last heard from in 1979, when he was living in the Overtown district of Miami, but has not been seen or heard from since.	
1979	J. C. P. Williams	47	London, England	Williams, a New Zealand cardiologist who discovered Williams syndrome, went missing in London. He was declared "a missing person presumed to be dead from 1978" by the High Court of New Zealand. However, Williams renewed his passport in Geneva in September 1979. He had possibly gone into hiding, as reports of alleged and indirect contact with him were made as recently as 2000.	
14 January 1979	Thomas DeSimone	28	New York, U.S.	DeSimone, an American mobster and associate of Henry Hill and the Lucchese crime family, was reported missing by his wife, Angela, on 14 January 1979. She said she had last seen DeSimone a few weeks earlier when he borrowed $60 from her. He was broadly considered to have been murdered in retaliation for any number of murders that DeSimone himself was involved in. However, no trace of him has ever been found.	
28 April 1979	Christina White	12	Asotin, Washington, U.S.	On 28 April 1979, Christina Lee White attended a parade with a friend, then later returned to the friend's home feeling sick. She called her mother who advised her to return home on her bike. White was not seen again. Authorities link her disappearance with the unsolved Lewis Clark Valley murders.	
5 November 1979	Martin Allen	15	London, England	Allen was last seen at King's Cross station at 3:50 pm on 5 November 1979, when he left his friends to go to his brother's house. A witness came forward to say that a 30-year-old male was seen at Gloucester Road tube station later that same afternoon in the company of a boy who looked like Allen. The man was heard to tell the boy not to try to run, and the witness stated that the boy looked scared. Theories exist that Allen fell prey to a paedophile gang operating in London and that he was murdered.	
5 November 1979	Deborah McCall	16	Downers Grove, U.S.	McCall was a high school student who disappeared after leaving Downers Grove North High School on 5 November 1979. Serial killer Bruce Lindahl is strongly suspected of involvement in her disappearance.	
11 November 1979	Ali Murad Davudi	56–57	Tehran, Iran	Davudi, an Iranian Baháʼí professor and member of the Spiritual Assembly, is thought to have been kidnapped and executed by government agents as part of the ongoing persecution.	
17 December 1979	Nasser Al Saeed	56	Beirut, Lebanon	Al Saeed, a Saudi Arabian writer and founder of the Arabian Peninsula People's Union most known for criticizing the Saudi royal family, was abducted by Saudi agents while in Beirut to conduct interviews, and was never seen again.	

== See also ==
- List of fugitives from justice who disappeared
- List of kidnappings
- List of murder convictions without a body
- List of people who disappeared mysteriously (pre-1910)
- List of people who disappeared mysteriously (1910–1970)
- List of people who disappeared mysteriously (1980s)
- List of people who disappeared mysteriously (1990s)
- List of people who disappeared mysteriously (2000–present)
- Lists of solved missing person cases
- List of unsolved deaths
