= Edward Andrews (disambiguation) =

Edward Andrews (1914–1985) was an American actor.

Edward, Ed or Eddie Andrews may also refer to:

- E. Wyllys Andrews IV (1916–1971), American archaeologist and Mayanist scholar
- Punch Andrews, real name Edward Andrews, music producer and manager
- Eddie Andrews (rugby union) (born 1977), South African rugby union player and politician
- Eddie Andrews (American politician), member of the Iowa House of Representatives
- Edward Deming Andrews (1894–1964), American historian and authority on the Shakers
- Edward Andrews (High Sheriff of Rutland)
- Edward Gayer Andrews (1825–1907), Bishop of the Methodist Episcopal Church
- Edward Pope Andrews (1908–?), missing person from Chicago.
- Edward William Andrews (1812–1877), newspaper editor in the Colony of South Australia
- Ed Andrews (1859–1934), baseball player
- Ed Andrews (blues musician) (fl. 1920s), American blues musician

== See also ==
- Ned G. Andrews, winner of 67th Scripps National Spelling Bee
- Edmund Andrews (disambiguation)
