= Kouroupis =

Kouroupis is a surname. Notable people with the surname include:

- Pavlos Kouroupis
- Theofilos Kouroupis
