= Battle of Lapithos–Karavas =

- Part of Turkish invasion of Cyprus
Date	August 6–8, 1974
Location	Lapithos and Karavas, Kyrenia District, Cyprus
Result	Turkish Victory
Territorial changes	Turkish forces secure the Kyrenia pocket and expand the northern beachhead.

Belligerents
Turkey	Cyprus

Commanders and leaders
(Turkey) Bedrettin Demirel (Commander, 28th Division)	(Cyprus) Spyridon Demellas (CO, 256th Battalion)

Strength
5,000-6,000; 30 to 40 M47 and M48 Patton tanks	400-600; 3 BTR-152V1; 1 TS APC

Casualties and losses
2 Tanks destroyed	150 killed or MIA; 3 BTR-152V1 lost 1 TS APC lost
- 149 civilians dead or missing (95 from Lapithos, 54 from Karavas); 54 civilians captured (44 from Lapithos, 14 from Karavas)

The Battle of Lapithos–Karavas was a localized yet strategically critical engagement fought between the Turkish Armed Forces and the Cypriot National Guard between August 6 and August 8, 1974. Despite taking place during a United Nations-mandated ceasefire, Turkish forces launched an offensive to eliminate a Greek Cypriot forces on their western flank.

== Background ==
Following the initial phase of the Turkish invasion, a ceasefire was brokered by the United Nations Security Council on July 23, 1974. At this stage, the Turkish military held a narrow corridor connecting their landing site at Pentemilli beach to the northern enclaves of Nicosia.

Directly adjacent to the western flank of this Turkish-controlled corridor lay the coastal towns of Lapithos and Karavas. These towns were heavily defended by elements of the Cypriot National Guard, primarily the under-strength 256th Infantry Battalion and elements of the 286th Mechanized Battalion. The Turkish High Command viewed this Greek Cypriot presence as a distinct tactical threat to their flank, fearing a potential counter-offensive to the coast if peace talks in Geneva collapsed.

== Battle ==
=== August 6 ===
In the early hours of August 6, 1974, Turkish forces broke the ceasefire by launching a coordinated amphibious, naval, and ground assault targeting Karavas and Lapithos. The operation was spearheaded by the Turkish 28th Infantry Division

The assault began with intense bombardment from Turkish naval vessels anchored offshore, paired with heavy artillery shelling from the heights overlooking the coast. Following the barrage, a column of M47 Patton tanks drove west along the main coastal highway toward Karavas. Simultaneously, Turkish commando brigade and the Turkish 61st infantry regiment moved over the Pentedaktylos mountains to flank the Greek Cypriots from the north-east.

=== August 7 ===
The defenders of the 256th Infantry Battalion were profoundly outmatched. The battalion had already sustained heavy attrition during the initial July landings. Despite these severe disparities, localized street-to-street fighting broke out within the towns. Small pockets of Greek Cypriot soldiers utilized light anti-tank weapons and small arms to temporarily slow the advancing Turkish infantry including destroying two Turkish M47 tanks with a recoilless rifles. However, by the afternoon of August 7, the Turkish commando units successfully secured the mountain passes behind the towns, effectively encircling the Greek Cypriot positions.

=== August 8 ===
By August 8, the Greek Cypriot defensive perimeter had completely shattered under the weight of superior numbers and heavy armor. With the coastal highway blocked by Turkish armor and the southern mountain trails occupied by Turkish commandos, the retreat of the 256th Battalion dissolved into chaos. Small groups of soldiers attempted to break out through the tightening net, but many were cut down in the open terrain or captured. By noon on August 8, both Lapithos and Karavas were firmly under Turkish military control.

== Aftermath ==
The 48-hour engagement resulted in severe casualties for the defending forces and local population.

=== Greek Losses ===
The 256th Infantry Battalion effectiveness was reduced as an organized combat unit, losing around 150 soldiers killed or missing in action. Due to the swiftness of the encirclement, many residents were unable to evacuate. Municipal registries and community tracking records later documented 95 from Lapithos and 54 from Karavas were reported dead or missing, 44 people of Lapithos and 14 of Karavas captured, and over 230 residents trapped in Lapithos and 80 in Karavas.

A significant portion of the Greek Cypriot casualties occurred post-surrender. In the decades following the conflict, the United Nations-backed Committee on Missing Persons in Cyprus (CMP) discovered multiple mass graves in the foothills of the Kyrenia range. Forensic exhumations and DNA identification confirmed that dozens of captured soldiers from the 256th Battalion had been executed on the spot with their hands bound.

=== Turkish Losses ===
While Turkey achieved all primary objectives, the intensity of the close-quarters defense resulted in two of their tanks destroyed and casualties that Turkish archives aggregated into the overall campaign total of 498 killed.

The capture of Lapithos and Karavas eliminated the Greek Cypriot salient and widened the Turkish northern beachhead by several critical miles. This broad, secure staging ground removed any threat to the Turkish flank, allowing them to consolidate heavy armor, logistics, and fresh infantry unhindered. Just six days later, on August 14, 1974, Turkey utilized this expanded staging ground to launch Operation Attila II, a massive sweep that successfully partitioned the northern 37% of the island within 72 hours.
