= Giovanni Colonna =

Giovanni Colonna or John Colonna may refer to:

- Giovanni Colonna (died 1245) (1170–1245), cardinal of the Roman Catholic Church
- Giovanni Colonna (archbishop) (1205–1263), archbishop of Messina, nephew of the cardinal
- Giovanni Colonna (historian) (1298–1343/44), Dominican and writer, friend of Petrarch
- Giovanni Colonna (cardinal, 1295–1348) (1295–1348), Roman Catholic cardinal
- Giovanni Colonna (cardinal, 1456–1508) (1456–1508), Roman Catholic cardinal
- Giovanni Paolo Colonna (c. 1637–1695), Italian musician and composer
- Giovanni Colonna (archaeologist) (born 1934), Italian scholar of ancient Italy
- John Colonna (born 1962), Puerto Rican child who disappeared along with his sister Gianinna
