= Akpan =

Akpan is a Nigerian masculine given name and surname of Ibibio and Efik origin which means 'first son'.

== Notable people with the name ==
=== Surname ===
- Andre Akpan (born 1987), American soccer player
- Bassey Akpan (born 1984), Nigerian footballer
- Hope Akpan (born 1991), English footballer
- Ime Akpan (born 1972), Nigerian hurdler
- Rita Akpan (born 1944), Nigerian politician
- Uwem Akpan (born 1971), Nigerian Jesuit priest and writer

=== Given name ===
- Akpan Hogan Ekpo (born 1954), Nigerian economist and professor
- Akpan Isemin (1939–2009), Nigerian politician
- Akpan Okon, 18th-century African ruler
- Akpan Utuk, Nigerian Army colonel
