= Nicolas Rossier =

American film director

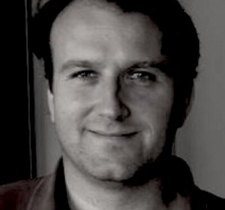
- Nicolas Rossier
- Born: Zurich, Switzerland
- Occupations: Journalist, film director

Nicolas Rossier is an American filmmaker and reporter best known for his biographical documentaries of the former president of Haiti, Jean-Bertrand Aristide and South African Nobel Peace Prize co-recipient (together with Nelson Mandela) F.W. de Klerk.

== Filmmaking career ==
Rossier was the first journalist to interview ousted president Jean-Bertrand Aristide after the 2004 Haitian coup d'état, with excerpts of this interview being featured in the documentary Aristide and the Endless Revolution. The film has been called "vital" by Variety and "taut, well-balanced and insightful" by The New York Times. Rossier was also the last journalist to interview Aristide before he was allowed to return to Haiti in 2010. His follow-up film, American Radical: The Trials of Norman Finkelstein, profiling the life and work of the controversial Jewish academic and author, received many positive reviews.

His work has aired on television networks around the world including PBS, Al Jazeera English, and the Hallmark Channel and leading international venues such as the Film Society of Lincoln Center in New York, IDFA in Amsterdam, the Rotterdam International Film Festival, and Hot Docs. His work has been praised by industry peers such as Michael Moore, Albert Maysles and Mark Achbar. He has collaborated with many notable professionals in the industry, among them veteran CBC News reporter David Ridgen and Emmy Award-winning producer Jon Alpert.

== Early career and biography ==
Rossier's first film, Life is a Dream: a Street Poet in New York was released in 2000 and won him the Audience Award at the New York Independent Film Festival. He followed up with Brothers and Others in 2003 which exposed the impact and backlash of the events of 9/11 on Arab and Muslim communities within the United States which aired primetime on the Hallmark Channel several times.

Nicolas Rossier was born and raised in Geneva, Switzerland. He pursued a career in the financial sector in Europe before relocating to New York City in 1998 to transition into a career in film and journalism. He has studied at the Graduate Institute of International and Development Studies, the Lee Strasberg Theatre and Film Institute, the School of Visual Arts and the New York Film Academy. He works and lives in Brooklyn, New York.

== Awards ==
Aristide and the Endless Revolution took the Best Documentary prize at the Pan-African Film Festival and was selected for the Amnesty International Doen Award at IDFA in Amsterdam. American Radical won the Audience Choice award at IFP/Chicago Underground Film Festival, the Cinema Politica Audience Award, the Jean Renoir Award for Best Anti- War Film and was named one of the 'top ten best political documentaries' by Screen Junkies.In June 2010, American Radical was invited to join the official collection of the Oscars library. In 2012, his short documentary ONE BREATH about free diver champion William Trubridge was voted best original reporting by CNN.

== Filmography ==
- Life is a Dream: A Street Poet in New York (2000) (with Emmanuel Tagnard)
- Brothers and Others (2003)
- Leila (2003) by Jean-Cyril Rossier (Executive Producer)
- The Bridge (2006) (Producer with Jon Alpert and Matthew O'Neill
- Aristide and the Endless Revolution (2005)
- American Radical: The Trials of Norman Finkelstein (2009) (with David Ridgen)
- One Breath - The Story of William Trubridge (2012)
- Good People go to Hell, Saved People go to Heaven (2012) by Holly Hardman (Executive Producer)
- The Other Man - F.W. de Klerk and the End of Apartheid (2015)
- Charlie VS Goliath (2016) by Reed Lindsay (Producer)
- Be Prepared (2018)
- Angels Unawares: The Work of Sculptor Timothy Schmalz (2025)
