= Menus for Moderns =

- Genre: Cooking show
- Presented by: Doreen Andrews
- Country of origin: Australia
- Original language: English

Production
- Running time: 30 minutes

Original release
- Network: ATN-7
- Release: 1960 – 1961

Menus for Moderns is an Australian television series which aired 1960–1961. It was a cooking show featuring Doreen Andrews.

Produced by and aired on Sydney station ATN-7 (this was prior to the creation of the Seven Network), it was a daytime series. The series aired in a half-hour time-slot on Mondays. At one point the series aired at 2:00PM, competing in the time-slot against Woman's World on ABN-2 and Happy Go Lucky on TCN-9.

== See also ==
- The Jean Bowring Show
- The Chef Presents
