= Disappearance of Adrien McNaughton =

1972 missing child case in Canada

Coordinates: 45.255173°N 76.872572°W

Adrien McNaughton
- Born: November 4, 1966; Arnprior, Ontario
- Disappeared: June 12, 1972 (aged 5) Presumed drowned. Holmes Lake, Greater Madawaska, Ontario
- Status: Missing for 54 years, 5 months and 10 days
- Height: 3 ft (0.91 m)
- Parents: Murray McNaughton (father); Barbara McNaughton (mother)

Adrien McNaughton (born November 4, 1966) was a five-year-old Canadian boy who went missing on June 12, 1972.

== Disappearance ==
While on a family fishing trip at Holmes Lake near Calabogie, Ontario, Adrien had been fishing for about an hour with his father, Murray McNaughton. Adrien became tired and stopped fishing because his line was tangled. He sat down on a nearby rock, then left the lakeshore to play a short distance away. He then wandered away from his father, his two older brothers, and a friend of his father into a wooded area. The father noticed Adrien was missing and sent Adrien's eldest brother, Lee McNaughton, to the car to search for him. When Lee didn't find Adrien a search was sent out to find him. Hours later, when Adrien was not found, the police were contacted. At the time of his disappearance he was wearing a blue nylon parka, an orange striped shirt, brown shorts, and boots with rubber soles.

== Investigation ==
A huge search was conducted to find McNaughton. Thousands of volunteers led by the armed forces searched the area where Adrien had gone missing. Extensive searching was conducted, but no clue to his whereabouts was found.

== Aftermath ==
In 2009, with the use of new digital technology, his parents hoped to find him as an adult. Also in 2009, when Adrien's parents were contacted by the Toronto Sun, his mother declined to be interviewed and referred questions to the police. A CBC original podcast called Someone Knows Something investigated Adrien McNaughton's disappearance, beginning in 2015. The show is hosted, written and produced by award-winning Canadian filmmaker David Ridgen, and its first episodes were released in March 2016. On April 23, 2016, as part of the investigation for SKS, five highly trained volunteers conducted a search dive of Holmes Lake, looking for the remains of McNaughton, after four separate cadaver dogs indicated that they were detecting human remains in the area. A tooth-like object and small piece of rubber that may have belonged to a shoe were uncovered under eight feet of water. The tooth-like object was examined by the police and was found to be not of human origin. In March 2018, the SKS and the team of volunteers conduct a fourth search of Holmes Lake for Adrien McNaughton, this time using a core sampler. They discovered that the lake reaches depths of over 30 ft with stacked layers of silt, debris, sediment separated by sections of water.

Three cadaver dogs were taken over the samples and gave 'the final response' on two samples—this behaviour is how the dogs indicate positive confirmation of human remains. The discoveries were reported to the local police who sent their own divers to the lake, only to conclude what was already known—that it would be impossible to find remains through a dive search due to the poor visibility and deep layers of sediment. While the SKS team believe there are human remains at the specific location where the core samples were taken, it has not been confirmed these remains belonged to Adrien.

== See also ==
- List of people who disappeared mysteriously (1970s)
