= Janice Pennington =

American model (born 1942)

Playboy centerfold appearance
- May 1971
- Preceded by: Chris Cranston
- Succeeded by: Lieko English

Personal details
- Born: Janice Maurine Pennington; July 8, 1942 (age 84) Seattle, Washington, United States
- Height: 5 ft 8 in (1.73 m)

Janice Maurine Pennington (born July 8, 1942) is an American former model and one of the original "Barker's Beauties" on The Price Is Right. As its longest-serving model, Pennington was with the show from its premiere in 1972 until 2000. She was also Playboy magazine's Playmate of the Month for the May 1971 issue. She is the older sister of fellow model Ann Pennington and cofounder of the Hollywood Film Festival.

== Personal life ==
Pennington was born in Seattle, Washington. She has been married three times. Her first marriage was to Glenn Jacobson, with whom she appeared in a spring 1967 episode (exact date unknown) of the daytime version of To Tell the Truth, hosted by Bud Collyer.

Her second husband was German mountain climber Friedrich "Fritz" Stammberger, who disappeared in Afghanistan in 1975 while mountain climbing. After years of searching, Pennington received classified information that he had been helping the CIA scout out mountain bases along the Afghanistan-Pakistan border and was killed during a battle with Soviet forces.

On April 20, 1984, Pennington married writer Carlos de Abreu, a native of Mozambique.

Pennington was a member of a music group called The Models partnered with Susan Schell, who released a single in 1967.The song "Bend Me, Shape Me" was later covered by The American Breedand had become a massive hit when it was released in October 1967.

== The Price Is Right ==
For 29 years, Pennington was a model on The Price Is Right, handing the microphone to Bob Barker at the start of more than 5,000 shows. She also worked with Dennis James and Tom Kennedy during the show's syndication runs in 1972–77 and 1985–86, respectively.

During a 1976 syndicated episode, host Dennis James referred to the mountain-climber doll in the Cliff Hangers game as "Fritz", unaware that Pennington's husband had disappeared while mountain climbing the previous year. When the contestant lost and the character fell from the cliff, James shouted, "There goes Fritz!", prompting Pennington to run from the stage in tears.

In June 1988, a camera struck Pennington during taping, rendering her unconscious. She was hospitalized, and taping resumed after 45 minutes. Surgery to address the injuries left her with one shoulder shorter than the other and scars, preventing her from wearing swimsuits on the show. A substitute model appeared during her recovery.

Pennington's final appearance on The Price Is Right was on the 13 December 2000 episode, following the show's acquisition by Pearson Television earlier that year. She signed a confidential settlement agreement upon departure.

Pennington and Barker were generally on amicable terms, unlike his relationships with other models who filed lawsuits against him. In a 2002 interview with Larry King Live, Barker praised Pennington for her support during the sexual harassment allegations brought by fellow model Dian Parkinson. During a USA Today interview discussing his retirement, Barker described Pennington as "very brave" and expressed sympathy for her following her husband's disappearance, before requesting a change of topic.

Pennington appeared in an episode of The E! True Hollywood Story about Price on January 27, 2002.

In an interview with Entertainment Tonight after Barker's death in August 2023, Pennington said she had not spoken to him since her departure but expressed no ill will and reflected positively on her time on the show.

Though she never appeared, Pennington was mentioned in the 2-part documentary series Dirty Rotten Scandals: The Price is Right on March 18, 2026.

== See also ==
- List of Playboy Playmates of the Month

Liv Lindeland	Willy Rey	Cynthia Hall	Chris Cranston	Janice Pennington	Lieko English
Heather Van Every	Cathy Rowland	Crystal Smith	Claire Rambeau	Danielle de Vabre	Karen Christy
