= American Radical: The Trials of Norman Finkelstein =

2009 American documentary film

- Directed by: David Ridgen; Nicolas Rossier
- Produced by: David Ridgen; Nicolas Rossier
- Cinematography: Nicolas Rossier; David Ridgen
- Edited by: Cameron Clendaniel; Eli Cohn
- Music by: Judd Greenstein
- Distributed by: Typecast Releasing; Mercury Media
- Release date: November 2009 (IDFA)
- Running time: 84 minutes
- Country: United States
- Language: English
- Budget: 280,000 USD

American Radical: The Trials of Norman Finkelstein is a 2009 documentary film about the life of the American academic Norman Finkelstein, directed and produced by David Ridgen and Nicolas Rossier. The documentary features Finkelstein and several of his supporters and opponents, including Noam Chomsky and Alan Dershowitz.

== Reception ==
The film made its world premiere in Chicago as part of the 2009 IFP Chicago Underground Film Festival and won the audience choice award for best documentary. It was shown at the Sheffield Doc/Fest, IDFA in Amsterdam and Hot Docs in Toronto. It won the Cinema Politica Audience Award in 2010. Jerusalem Film Festival describes the work of the filmmakers as: "the most talked-about documentary films of the last months, a fascinating portrait that confidently walks that tightrope known as balance". The film had its television premiere on Yes Television in Israel in May 2010. In April 2011, the film aired on Al Jazeera English worldwide and in the United States on Link TV and selected PBS stations.

== Reviews ==
In February 2010, the film opened in New York and received 100% freshness ratings on Rotten Tomatoes, using data from 222 ratings and 11 reviewers. Despite the many controversies surrounding Norman Finkelstein, major national Jewish publications such as The Jewish Daily Forward, Jewish Week and the Jewish Telegraphic Agency reviewed the film favorably. According to the distributor's website, the film has also received endorsements from personalities such as Mark Achbar, Michael Moore, historian Charles Glass and Canadian-born actor Saul Rubinek. The film was invited to join the collection of the Oscars's library in June 2010.
