= Vladimir Chávez =

Chilean politician who disappeared in 1973

- Born: Vladimir Lenin Chávez Rodríguez; December 7, 1939; Bulnes, Chile
- Disappeared: 1973 (age 33)
- Occupations: Politician, Teacher
- Spouse: Carmen López
- Children: 3
- Parents: Néstor Chávez (father); Graciela Rodríguez (mother)

Vladimir Lenin Chávez Rodríguez (born December 7, 1939) is a Chilean politician who disappeared in Chile in 1973.

== Early life and background ==
Chávez had attended the Men's High School of Concepción and at the School of Preceptors of the same city, graduating as a primary teacher and leader of the College of Teachers. He was a member of the Communist Party since 1960, where he held the positions of secretary of the local committee of Penco and regional secretary of Concepción. During the Popular Unity government he held the positions of mayor of the provinces of O'Higgins and Concepción, where he remained until October 27, 1972.

Chávez was elected deputy for the 9th departmental group of Rancagua, Caupolicán and San Vicente for the period 1973–1977. He was part of the permanent commission of Agriculture and Colonization. However, the coup d'état of September 11, 1973 suspended the National Congress, ending its parliamentary functions.

== Disappearance and aftermath ==
In 1973, Chávez disappeared in Chile following a coup and was never seen again. His ultimate fate is unknown.

== Personal life ==
He married Carmen Liliana Baroni López, with whom he has three children whose names are Ricardo, Esteban and Iván.

== See also ==
- List of people who disappeared mysteriously (1970s)
