= Disappearance of Donald Izzett =

1995 missing person case in the United States

Donald Izzett
- Born: Donald Lee Izzett, Jr. November 5, 1975; Fort Knox, Kentucky, U.S.
- Disappeared: May 14, 1995 (aged 19); Fernwood, Mississippi, U.S.
- Status: Missing for 31 years, 3 months and 16 days
- Education: Frostburg State University
- Height: 6 ft 2 in (188 cm)

Donald Lee Izzett Jr., commonly referred to as "Donnie", is an American man who has been missing since May 1995 under mysterious circumstances. A young man at the time, Izzett was traveling the country after being discharged from the military for being gay. His last known contact was a Mother's Day phone call between him and his mother, Debra Izzett Skelley, on May 14, 1995. In June 2019, Pike County Police Department discovered human remains in McComb, Mississippi that may have connection to the Izzett case.

== Personal life ==
Izzett was born on November 5, 1975, to Debra Skelley and Donald Izzett Sr. in Kentucky, before relocating to Western Maryland with his mother. After graduating near the top of his class from Fort Hill High School, Izzett enlisted in the U.S. Army in July 1993. After moving to Florida for basic training, Izzett wished to be discharged due to being far from family. Izzett reenlisted with the United States Air Force in February 1994. After admitting he was gay, Izzett was discharged in March 1994 due to the Don't ask, don't tell military policy in effect at the time. Izzett returned home to Maryland and began studying journalism at Frostburg State University. The following year, Izzett departed Cumberland, Maryland for a cross-country road trip in May 1995.

== Disappearance ==
In May 1995, Skelley contacted the Maryland State Police after receiving a distressing phone call from her son while he was in Santa Monica, California. State Police claimed Izzett left on his own free will and was not missing from Allegany County, Maryland. In October 1995, Skelley received mail of an overdue speeding ticket for Izzett driving a Mazda Miata registered to George "Shane" Guenther from Buckeye, Arizona on May 22, 1995. Research into the citation led Skelley to contact Guenther's mother, Sue Guenther, who witnessed Izzett and Guenther having an argument at the family's farmhouse in McComb, Mississippi, about 100 miles north of New Orleans.

Guenther's college roommate, Kyle Barnes, came forward claiming Guenther killed Izzett by shooting him three times and burning the body on the McComb property. After sponsoring numerous unsuccessful archaeological digs at the McComb property in the 1990s, 2016, and 2018, a team was successful in discovering human-like remains at the burn site in 2019, but require lab testing to prove their origin.

== Media ==
Beginning in May 2020, the Canadian Broadcasting Corporation podcast Someone Knows Something focused on the case in its sixth season.

== See also ==
- List of people who disappeared mysteriously: post-1970
- List of unsolved murders (1980–1999)
