= Disappearance of Andy Puglisi =

1976 missing child case

Andy Puglisi
- Andy, c. 1976
- Born: September 2, 1965
- Disappeared: August 22, 1976 (aged 10); Lawrence, Massachusetts, U.S.
- Status: Missing for 50 years, 2 months and 27 days
- Height: 4 ft 0 in (1.22 m)
- Parents: Angelo Puglisi (father); Faith Puglisi (mother)

The disappearance of Angelo "Andy" Puglisi (born September 2, 1965) is an unsolved case of a 10-year-old American boy who went missing on August 22, 1976, from the Higgins Memorial pool across the street from his apartment in the Stadium Housing Projects, Lawrence, Massachusetts.

== Disappearance ==
External image
- Age progression of Puglisi to age 50

Melanie Perkins and Andy met at the pool late in the morning of August 22, 1976. As usual, they spent the entire day playing there. At about 2:00 that afternoon, Melanie was hungry and decided to go home. While she usually walked by herself to her mother's apartment less than 200 yards (180 m) away, on this occasion, a feeling that she could not describe made her afraid to go alone. Andy was not ready to leave, so Melanie's 11-year-old brother, Jeff, walked her home. Melanie last saw Andy sitting by the pool in his green bathing trunks, talking with friends.

Later, at around 3:30 P.M., Andy called home. The phone was answered by one of his brothers, and Andy reportedly did not indicate any problems at the time. The last known sighting of Andy was at roughly 5:45 P.M., when a lifeguard saw him walking around the pool area. Andy never returned home that evening; while authorities initially thought he might have run away, as his parents were divorced and he may have felt torn between them, they soon came to suspect foul play.

=== Search ===
National Guard troops and Green Berets scoured the neighborhood the next day, with neighbors and truckers with CB radios assisting with the search. Dogs were brought in to sniff a local city dump and woods adjacent to the pool. Scuba divers dragged the nearby Shawsheen River. In all, more than 2,000 volunteers participated in the search. The search was called off after six days.

Two weeks after Andy's disappearance, Wayne W. Chapman was arrested in Waterloo, New York. In his van, police found Polaroid pictures of naked children, maps of wooded areas, a fake police badge and starter pistol, duct tape, 8 mm movies of children, child pornography, high-end camera equipment, a bloody child's sock and rope. Shortly afterward, Chapman confessed to raping two boys in Puglisi's hometown of Lawrence and, according to one of the victims later interviewed by Melanie Perkins, displayed a familiarity with the area. On other occasions, Chapman also pretended that he had never been to Lawrence, which was proven to be a lie. Despite being considered a prime suspect, Chapman was not arrested or charged in relation to the Puglisi case because police did not have sufficient evidence to establish probable cause.

=== Later developments ===
Puglisi's parents divorced in 1975, and his father later moved to New Hampshire.

In 1998, while conducting research for a documentary, Melanie Perkins met with two locals, Alan and Tony, who described finding a rectangular hole dug in the woods near the pool a year or two after Andy's disappearance when the two were children. They described the hole as being "perfectly rectangular, with a flat bottom and flat sides" and looking "like something had been removed from it – like a chest, or a crate, or maybe a coffin." The hole was filled in two days later, and neither individual reported the finding until hearing about Perkins' documentary. Perkins added that she had heard rumors a year after Andy's disappearance that the police intended to dig in the area Alan and Tony described to her.

== In media ==
In 2007, a feature-length documentary film, Have You Seen Andy?, was made by Melanie Perkins. It was broadcast on HBO and won the National Emmy for Best Investigative Journalism in 2008.

In 2016, the case was profiled on the podcast The Vanished.

In 2024, the 8-part podcast series, Open Investigation was made by Melanie Perkins. This podcast provided updates to the 2007 documentary and covered unresolved cases of missing and murdered children as well as the history of child trafficking in the United States.

== See also ==
- List of people who disappeared mysteriously (1970s)
