= Chris Cranston =

American model and actress

Playboy centerfold appearance
- April 1971
- Preceded by: Cynthia Hall
- Succeeded by: Janice Pennington

Personal details
- Born: September 14, 1946 (age 80) Santa Monica, California, U.S.
- Height: 5 ft 7.5 in (1.71 m)

Chris Cranston (born September 14, 1946, in Santa Monica, California) is an American model and actress. She is best known for being Playboy magazine's Playmate of the Month for its April 1971 issue. Her centerfold was photographed by Mario Casilli.

Cranston had small parts in the 1965 film Beach Blanket Bingo and the 1968 musical Funny Girl. In 1967, she appeared on the front, back, and inside cover of a record jacket for the album Golden Greats by The Ventures. She had appeared in the September 1968 issue of Playboy in the "Girls of Funny Girl" pictorial. She also a regular on the syndicated Playboy After Dark program. In 1977 she was a winning contestant on Match Game.

== See also ==
- List of people in Playboy 1970–1979

| Liv Lindeland | Willy Rey | Cynthia Hall | Chris Cranston | Janice Pennington | Lieko English |
| Heather Van Every | Cathy Rowland | Crystal Smith | Claire Rambeau | Danielle de Vabre | Karen Christy |
