= Aristide and the Endless Revolution =

2005 film

- Directed by: Nicolas Rossier
- Release date: 2005
- Countries: United States; Switzerland

Aristide and the Endless Revolution is a 2005 feature documentary directed and produced by Nicolas Rossier about former Haitian President Jean-Bertrand Aristide and the coup d'etat that ousted him from the country in 2004. Rossier was the first media professional to get exclusive access to Aristide while in exile and the resultant interview is featured in the film, as well as interviews with many experts on Haiti, including U.S. Representative Maxine Waters, noted economist Jeffrey Sachs and Aristide's lawyer Ira J. Kurzban.

== Background ==
Jean-Bertrand Aristide won Haiti's first democratic presidential election in 1990 but was overthrown and exiled the following year. He was restored to his presidency in 1994 and won the next election in 2000 but 2004 brought another coup which removed Aristide from power once again. Although he was and remains extremely popular with Haitian citizens, many critics and opponents of the man contend that his government was rife with corruption and ineffective at addressing the country's severe economic woes. The role of the U.S. government in the 2004 ouster remains highly contentious. The film delves into the build-up of that event, as well as the history of Haitian independence and the rise of Aristide from poverty to presidency. Rossier speaks with many prominent figures in and outside of Haiti, including American author and academic Noam Chomsky, actor and activist Danny Glover and the Assistant Secretary of State for Western Hemisphere Affairs under President George W. Bush, Roger Noriega.

== Reception ==
The film was released in 2005 and screened at many festivals worldwide, including Vancouver, São Paulo, BAFICI, Cuba, IDFA in Amsterdam and RIDM in Montreal. It won "Best Feature Documentary" and the audience award for best documentary at the Los Angeles Pan-African Film Festival. It opened on televisions in Canada CBC Radio Canada, France Public Senat and on selective PBS stations and Link TV in the USA and received critical praise throughout its theatrical and broadcast runs. The film was widely reviewed and garnered positive write-ups in many publications including The New York Times and Variety. Haitian activist Nadine Dominique - daughter of slain journalist Jean Dominique - declared that "the film deserves to be seen by Haitians ... [it] seems to be exactly what we need today". Paul Farmer, founder of Partners in Health and featured in the documentary, wrote that, "I saw it twice and showed it to friends in Haiti... [it is] a great tool." The film was nominated at IDFA in Amsterdam for the Amnesty International Doen Award.
