= Someone Knows Something =

Canadian crime podcast and radio program

'Someone Knows Something'
- Genre: Investigative journalism; Serialized audio narrative
- Language: English

Creative team
- Written by: David Ridgen

Cast and voices
- Hosted by: David Ridgen

Music
- Theme music composed by: Bob Wiseman

Production
- Production: David Ridgen (writer/host/investigator); Cesil Fernandes (senior producer); Chris Oke (senior producer); Arif Noorani (executive producer); Steph Kampf (Producer, Season 2,3,4); Sandra Bartlett (Producer, Season 1); Ashley Walters (Mixer, Season 1); Craig Desson (digital producer Season 1); Olsy Sorokina (digital producer Season 1); Eunice Kim (Producer, Season 2, 3, 4, 5, 6)

Technical specifications
- Audio format: MP3

Publication
- No. of seasons: 8
- No. of episodes: 67 + updates
- Original release: March 2, 2016
- Provider: CBC Radio
- Updates: Weekly

Related
- Website: www.cbc.ca/radio/sks

Someone Knows Something (or SKS for short) is a podcast by Canadian award-winning filmmaker and writer David Ridgen, first released in March 2016. The series is hosted, written and produced by Ridgen and mixed by Cesil Fernandes. The series is also produced by Chris Oke and executive producer Arif Noorani.

Using investigative journalism, Ridgen narrates a nonfiction story about a criminal cold case over multiple episodes. Episodes are released on a weekly basis; most of the Season 1 episodes ranged from 15 to 40 minutes in length, with Season 2 episodes ranging between 32 and 80 minutes in length. Season 4 was released in February 2018. Season 5 began in October 2018.

Someone Knows Something is Ridgen's first podcast experience; it is also CBC Radio's first true-crime podcast.

Episodes of Someone Knows Something are also sometimes broadcast on CBC Radio One as substitute programming, such as on public holidays and during the summer when some of its regular shows are on hiatus.

== Series overview ==
The first season of SKS focuses on the June 12, 1972, disappearance of Adrien McNaughton, a five-year-old boy who vanished during a family fishing trip in Eastern Ontario. The McNaughton family is from Arnprior, Ontario, where Ridgen grew up (he and his family moved there shortly after Adrien's disappearance).

The second season follows the disappearance of Sheryl Sheppard in Hamilton, Ontario. Sheppard went missing on January 2, 1998, two days after her boyfriend, Michael Lavoie, offered a proposal of marriage on a live TV broadcast. With some assistance from Sheppard's mother, Odette Fisher, Ridgen looks into the case as well as the backgrounds of both Sheryl and Michael, who has been the only person the Hamilton Police Service has named as a suspect in Sheryl's disappearance.

Season 3 of SKS, all six episodes of which were released during the week of November 7, 2017, revisits the 1964 deaths of two teenagers in Mississippi, Charles Moore and Henry Dee; Ridgen previously explored the cold case in a 2007 documentary for CBC, Mississippi Cold Case, which resulted in a re-opening of the case and the eventual conviction of James Ford Seale for the abductions of Moore and Dee.

In early 2018, Season 4 explored another murder Ridgen had documented for CBC, that of Wayne Greavette, who was killed through the use of a flashlight bomb sent to him in the mail.

Season 5 premiered in October 2018 focusing on the 1986 rape and murder of Kerrie Ann Brown in Thompson, Manitoba.

Season 6 premiered in May 2020, Donald Izzett Jr. disappeared on Mother's Day 1995.

Season 7 premiered on May 14, 2023 and it focuses on the 1998 murder of Dr. Barnett Slepian, a doctor who was performing abortions. He was murdered by James Charles Kopp an affiliate of the militant Roman Catholic anti-abortion group, The Lambs of Christ. It also goes into how Kopp may be connected to three similar shootings that happened in Canada.

Season 8 premiered on September 18, 2023. it focuses on the 2007 unsolved disappearance and murder of eighteen-year-old Angel Carlick from Whitehorse, Yukon.

== Episodes ==
=== Season 1 ===
No.	Title	Length (minutes:seconds)	Original release date
0	"Prologue: 'Do it, David. Do it.'"	6:39	February 28, 2016
1	"The family"	23:57	February 29, 2016
2	"Mr. Ring"	28:21	March 7, 2016
3	"The theories"	39:32	March 14, 2016
4	"Hello, Adrien?"	27:57	March 21, 2016
5	"Breeze & Grief"	27:41	February 28, 2016
6	"The scent"	31:44	April 3, 2016
7	"First Attempt"	34:26	April 10, 2016
8	"Clyde Forks"	39:18	April 17, 2016
9	"What we know"	13:25	April 24, 2016
10	"The Abyss"	44:13	May 2, 2016
11	"Terminus"	37:13	May 12, 2016
TBA	"Season 1 Update"	9:23	December 7, 2016
Released during Season 2, this update offers outcomes of dives into Holmes Lake that took place after Season 1's conclusion.

=== Season 2 ===
On October 21, 2016, a message posted on the show's Facebook page announced that Season 2 is "coming soon". The first episode of the second season aired on November 21, 2016, with episodes released on a weekly basis (excluding a break for Boxing Week) through the season's conclusion on February 12. It was rebroadcast in the summer of 2017, from June 29 to September 3.

No.	Title	Length (minutes:seconds)	Original release date
1	"The Trailer Park"	43:16	November 21, 2016
Ridgen meets Sheryl Sheppard's mother, Odette Fisher, who recalls learning of her daughter's disappearance after returning from visiting family in New Brunswick, as well as learning second-hand of Sheryl's marriage proposal from her boyfriend, Michael Lavoie.
2	"The Hammer"	44:17	November 28, 2016
Ridgen begins to piece together what happened the weekend of Sheryl's disappearance and speaks with Hamilton Police Service detectives about their original investigation as well as their discovery of Lavoie suffocating from carbon monoxide fumes.
3	"Blondie"	1:16:52	December 5, 2016
4	"Intimation"	46:37	December 12, 2016
A look into Sheryl's possible whereabouts in the hours before her disappearance; an examination of the apartment Sheryl, Michael, and Odette Fisher shared — a place where police forensic officers had performed an extensive survey for clues.
5	"Girlfriend"	43:50	December 19, 2016
6	"Stepbrother"	32:11	January 2, 2017
Before dating Michael, Sheila Darbyson had a relationship with Michael's stepbrother, Mark Dempsey, who speaks with David about family ties, betrayal, and the criminal code.
7	"Ghost"	37:51	January 9, 2017
Following an unsuccessful trip out West to speak with the mother of Michael's children, Ridgen heads back to Hamilton to learn more details about the police's original investigation, and speaks with a Hamilton Spectator reporter who covered the case.
8	"Gwen"	39:30	January 16, 2017
9	"The Appearance of Force"	50:05	January 23, 2017
A forensic psychologist decodes Michael and Sheryl's body language in the New Year's Eve proposal video; one of that broadcast's hosts talks with David; possible violence between Michael and Sheryl is examined.
10	"Mom"	1:01:03	January 30, 2017
Seeking background on Michael Lavoie, Ridgen speaks with Michael's mother, other members of the Lavoie family, and those who knew Michael as a child.
11	"Blackmail"	1:12:43	February 6, 2017
12	"Lavoie"	1:20:37	February 13, 2017
Sheryl's possible current whereabouts are considered; two of Sheryl's closest friends shed light on Sheryl's behavior before her disappearance; Ridgen makes contact with Michael Lavoie, who has long remained silent about the case.

=== Season 3 ===
No.	Title	Length (minutes:seconds)	Original air Date
1	"The Wrong Body"	1:11:21	November 5, 2017
2	"The Klansman"	1:01:37	November 5, 2017
3	"The Hornet's Nest"	42:29	November 5, 2017
4	"Bunkley"	47:41	November 5, 2017
5	"The Bridge"	49:20	November 5, 2017
6	"Reckoning"	50:20	November 5, 2017
7	"Epilogue"	45:41	November 5, 2017
TBA	"Bonus: Return to Mississippi"	27:00	September 22, 2019

=== Season 4 ===
No.	Title	Length (minutes:seconds)	Original air Date
1	"9-1-1"	50:12	February 4, 2018
2	"Death Letter"	45:32	February 11, 2018
3	The Deer	42:10	February 18, 2018
4	D&L	40:08	February 25, 2018
5	Jr.	1:02:17	March 4, 2018

=== Season 5 ===
No.	Title	Length (minutes:seconds	Original air Date
1	"Ravens"	1:03:12	October 15,2018
2	"Dead End"	1:11:09	October 15,2018
3	"Helen Betty Osborne"	54:15	October 21, 2018
4	"Graveyard Road"	1:04:18	October 21, 2018
5.1	"Part 1: Rolly"	37:19	October 28, 2018
5.2	"Part 2: Mad Max"	31:33	October 28, 2018
6	"The Call"	54:19	October 28, 2018
7	"Luella"	58:07	November 4, 2018
8	"Other Brother"	55:50	November 4, 2018
9	"Marnie"	1:05:36	November 11, 2018
10.1	"Part 1: Sumner"	55:53	November 18, 2018
10.2	"Part 2: Sumner"	27:20	November 18, 2018
TBA	"Extra: Spread the Word"	59:00	October 14, 2020
TBA	"Update: 'I was here all night'"	48:30	March 5, 2019

=== Season 6 ===
No.	Title	Length (minutes:seconds)	Original Air Date
1	'Mother's Day'	48.47	May 10, 2020
2	'Pitfire'	50:00	May 17, 2020
3	'Frenemy'	55:51	May 24,2020
4	'Fragments'	1:06:36	May 31, 2020
5	'The Test'	59:59	June 7, 2020

=== Season 7 ===
No.	Title	Length (minutes:seconds)	Original Air Date
1	'Aiding, Abetting, Abortion'	32:30	May 14, 2022
2	'Remembrance'	32:03	May 15, 2022
3	'The Informant'	49:14	May 16, 2022
4	'What's Left Behind'	39:18	May 24, 2022
5	'Nemesis'	39:36	May 30, 2022
6	'Mississippi'	47:15	June 7, 2022
7	'Darkworld'	41:41	June 13, 2022
8	'A Network of Support'	23:20	July 13, 2022

=== Season 8 ===
No.	Title	Length (minutes:seconds)	Original Air Date
1	'Angel'	46:58	September 18, 2023
2	'Wendy'	41:17	September 25, 2023
3	'The Saddest Song in the World'	42:23	October 2, 2023
4	'Photograph'	39:23	October 9, 2023
5	'Return to Pilot Mountain'	41:14	October 16, 2023
6	'The Price of Admission'	31:56	October 23, 2023
7	'Take it to the Limit'	31:35	October 30, 2023
