= Hollywood Film Festival =

Annual film festival in Los Angeles, USA

- Location: Los Angeles, California, United States
- Founded: 1997
- Festival date: October
- Language: English
- Website: hollywoodfilmfestival.com

The Hollywood Film Festival is an annual film festival that takes place in Los Angeles, California, USA.

== History ==
The Hollywood Film Festival was established in 1997 by author and producer Carlos de Abreu and his wife, model Janice Pennington. The festival was created to make a connection between independent filmmakers and the global creative community.

The Hollywood Film Festival is composed of:

- Hollywood Animation Film Festival
- Hollywood Comedy Film Festival
- Hollywood Digital Film Festival
- Hollywood Documentary Film Festival
- Hollywood Horror Film Festival
- Hollywood Independent Film Festival
- Hollywood International Film Festival
- Hollywood Kids Film Festival
- Hollywood Shorts Film Festival
- Hollywood World Film Festival
