= David Ridgen =

Canadian filmmaker

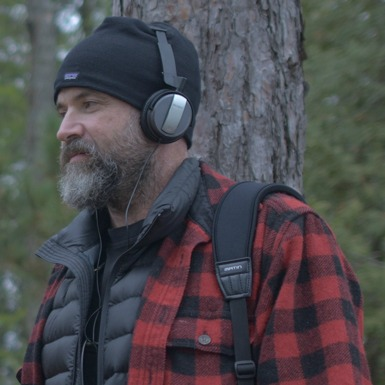
- Born: Stratford, Ontario, Canada
- Occupation: Filmmaker
- Years active: 1989–present
- Employer(s): CBC; Ridgen Film Corporation
- Website: ridgenfilm.com

David Ridgen is an independent Canadian filmmaker born in Stratford, Ontario. He has worked for CBC Television, MSNBC, NPR, TVOntario and others. He is currently the writer, producer and host of CBC Radio’s true-crime podcast series, Someone Knows Something and The Next Call.

== Early work (1990-2000) ==
Ridgen assisted his brother Robert to make Canadian Images of Vietnam in 1990. The compilation, produced and researched by Robert, was acquired by the Canadian Museum of Contemporary Photography in 1991. From February to April 2013, Canadian Images of Vietnam was featured in the National Gallery of Canada installation, "Clash: Conflict and its Consequences".

== Later work (2000-present) ==
Ridgen's first feature drama, Memento, was released to critical acclaim in 1996 on a riverboat in Kingston, Ontario.

In 2000, Ridgen's critically acclaimed documentary about Palestinian refugees in Lebanon, On the Borders of Gardens, earned him a prestigious Canadian Association of Journalists Award.

A 2003 film, Buried Alive, made for CBC Television, was about a group of people seeking spiritual enlightenment by digging their own graves and being buried in them overnight. This film won a Bronze Plaque Award at the Columbus International Film and Video Festival.

Ridgen made Return to Mississippi in 2004 for CBC Television, about the potential for a trial in the case of the three Mississippi Burning victims: civil rights workers Michael Schwerner, James Chaney, and Andrew Goodman.

During the production of Return to Mississippi, Ridgen learned of the 1964 Klan murder of two 19-year-old African-American men, Henry Hezekiah Dee and Charles Eddie Moore. This led him to produce his next film, Mississippi Cold Case, a documentary so compelling it led Mississippi state officials to re-open their investigation into the case, which resulted in Klansman James Ford Seale being convicted of conspiracy and kidnapping and handed three concurrent life sentences. Ridgen and Mississippi Cold Case won many awards, including the IRE Top Medal for Investigative Reporting, a Gemini for Best Director, a CAJ for Best Investigative Program, several Yorkton Golden Sheafs including Best of Festival, a CINE Golden Eagle and an Emmy Nomination for Best Investigative Documentary.

Ridgen's 2009 documentary, American Radical: The Trials of Norman Finkelstein, co-directed and co-produced with Nicolas Rossier, was about the life of controversial political scientist Norman Finkelstein. American Radical was released in 2009, premiering at the Chicago Underground Film Festival and winning the Audience Choice Award. The film went on to screen at dozens of festivals and venues worldwide, earning another Audience Award at the Cinema Politica/RIDM Festival. American Radical had its world television premiere on Israeli Television, Yes, and also aired on Al Jazeera and RT.

=== Work with Civil Rights Cold Case Project ===
In 2008, Ridgen, along with John Fleming of the Anniston Star, spearheaded The Civil Rights Cold Case Project with Paperny Films and the Center for Investigative Reporting. The Project brought together partners from across the media and legal spectrum to reveal long-neglected truths behind scores of race-motivated murders from the civil rights era, and to help facilitate reconciliation and healing. The Project sponsored work in other Civil Rights era cold cases, including the 1964 Klan murders of two African Americans: shoe-shop owner Frank Morris, murdered in Ferriday, Louisiana, and Clifton Walker, a Natchez, Mississippi mill worker.

In 2011, Ridgen worked with Civil Rights Cold Case Project members Stanley Nelson and David Paperny to produce Murder at the Shoe Shop, a radio documentary for NPR and CBC Television, about the Frank Morris case. The documentary aired the same day Stanley Nelson published an article in the Concordia Sentinel newspaper revealing for the first time the identity of Arthur Leonard Spencer, a man alleged to have participated in Morris' murder. Weeks later, the U.S. Department of Justice initiated a Grand Jury proceeding into the Morris case.

=== Investigative films ===
Ridgen has made four investigative films about alleged cold cases for the CBC.

The first, A Garden of Tears (2009), was about the 1975 murder of Kathryn Mary Herbert in Abbotsford, British Columbia.

The second, The Bomb that Killed Wayne Greavette (2009), about the killing of Greavette through the use of a flashlight bomb sent in the mail, was nominated for two 2010 Gemini Awards.

The third, Sharin (2010), was about the brutal 1983 murder of nine-year-old Sharin' Morningstar Keenan and the search for the prime suspect in the case.

Ridgen's fourth film in his Canadian Cold Case series, Confession to Murder Part I (2012), was about the 1993 disappearance of 15-year-old Christine Harron and a man named Anthony Edward Ringel who allegedly confessed 11 years later to killing her. The documentary revealed that Ringel was discharged before trial due to police errors and rulings on evidence admissibility. Confession to Murder Part I aired on May 18, 2012, the 19th anniversary of Christine's disappearance. It was nominated for a 2013 Canadian Screen Award and on the evening of the awards, February 27, 2013, Anthony Edward Ringel was re-arrested by the Ontario Provincial Police and charged with the first degree murder of Christine Harron; police saying they had obtained fresh evidence. A Confession to Murder Part II aired on CBC Television March 8, 2013, with information about Anthony Ringel's re-arrest.

== Someone Knows Something ==
In 2016, Ridgen launched Someone Knows Something, CBC Radio’s first true-crime podcast. The show investigates small-town cold cases, and reports on them in near real time.

The first season focuses on the 1972 disappearance of Adrien McNaughton, a five-year-old boy who vanished during a family fishing trip in Eastern Ontario. The McNaughton family is from Arnprior, Ontario. Ridgen grew up in Arnprior, moving there with his family shortly after Adrien’s disappearance.

Season 2 focuses on the 1998 disappearance of Sheryl Sheppard, a 29-year-old woman who vanished on New Years Day in Hamilton, Ontario. Her mother, Odette Fisher, has been searching for her missing daughter.

In Season 3, Ridgen revisits his documentary Mississippi Cold Case. In 1964, the remains of Charles Moore and Henry Dee were found in the Mississippi River. No one was ever convicted. 40 years later, Charles's brother, Thomas, returns to Mississippi with Ridgen to reopen the case.

In Season 4, Ridgen revisits his case of Wayne Greavette's death by a bomb mailed to him as a flashlight.

Season 5 premiered in October 2018. It focuses on the 1986 rape and murder of Kerrie Ann Brown in Thompson, Manitoba.

Season 6 premiered in May 2020, and focused on the disappearance of Donald Izzett on Mother's Day 1995.
