= Edmund Andrews =

Edmund Andrews may refer to:

- Edmund Andrews (surgeon) (1824–1904), American surgeon
- Edmund L. Andrews, journalist and author
