= Pavlos Kouroupis =

Greek soldier (born 1929)

- Born: 1929; Dentra, Messenia, Greece
- Disappeared: 22 July 1974 (aged 44–45); Kyrenia, Cyprus
- Status: Missing for 52 years and 1 day
- Education: Evelpidon Military Academy, Aristotle University of Thessaloniki
- Occupation: Colonel
- Known for: First commanding officer defending Cyprus during the start of the Turkish invasion of Cyprus, first disappearance of the conflict.
- Spouse: Maria (Mary) Kouroupis (née Karvouni)
- Children: 1
- Awards: Lieutenant General (posthumously)

Pavlos Kouroupis (Greek: Παύλος Κουρούπης; born 1929, disappeared 22 July 1974) was an officer in the Hellenic Army. At the time of the Turkish invasion of Cyprus in 1974, Kouroupis was a Colonel and CO of the 251st Battalion of the Cypriot National Guard, the unit closest to the Turkish landing site. With his unit, Kouroupis opposed the Turkish army at the Battle of Pentemili beachhead, stalling its advance for two days. Kouroupis was forced to retreat before Turkish forces and is considered the first missing person of the conflict. Kouroupis was presumed dead during the defence of Kyrenia.

According to published reports in the Greek press, the Greek Intelligence Agency attempted a rescue of Kouroupis and other Greek Army officers who were held captive in Turkey. The rescue operation failed and Kouroupis' fate is unknown. He was posthumously awarded the rank of Lieutenant General of the Hellenic Army, the highest military rank of the Hellenic Army. Pavlou Kouroupi Street, in the Aglantzia suburb of Cyprus' capital Nicosia is named after him.

== Life and education ==
Kouroupis was born in 1929 in Dentra, Messenia to a rural family, and was the third of six siblings. Kouroupis grew up in Dentra and went to school in Kalamata. Since an early age Kouroupis wanted to become an officer of the Hellenic Army. In 1952 Kouroupis graduated from the Evelpidon Military Academy.

Following his graduation from the military academy, Kouroupis studied at and graduated from the Law School of the Aristotle University of Thessaloniki, in 1965. Two years later in 1967, he also concluded his studies at the Higher War School of Greece with honours. At around that time Kouroupis married Maria Karvouni, and, subsequently, they had a daughter, named Evangelia.

== Military career ==
In 1972, Kouroupis, who was a tagmatarchis at the time, was transferred to Cyprus and became commander of the 251 tagma of the Cypriot National Guard in Kyrenia, near the village of Templos. In 1974, he was ordered to defend the city from the Turkish invasion of Cyprus which had just begun. He had only two lochoi at his command and he was defending the city against the numerically far superior 50th battalion of the Turkish army which was landing at the beach with the Battle of Pentemili beachhead just commencing.

Kouroupis defended the beachhead with the 1st lochos and a support lochos of heavy armaments. The military forces under Kouroupis command also included officers working at the lochos headquarters, military cooks, and people who had been ordered back to military service. Kouroupis also had a small force of 5 T-34 tanks at his disposal.

Kouroupis' forces were against a superior Turkish battalion force which was supported by aircraft, artillery and naval forces. Despite that, the two companies under Kouroupis' command were able to halt the advance of the Turkish forces and confine them in an area 0.35 by 1 km (0.22 mi × 0.62 mi). Kouroupis with a force of about 250–300 men was able to halt the advance of a Turkish force of 3500 men of the Turkish battalion Çakmak (Tsakmak).

On the first day of the invasion, the Turkish forces were unable to advance according to their plans, due to the strong resistance they encountered from the Greek forces under the command of Kouroupis. However, a night raid by the Greek forces against the Turkish forces on the beachhead was unsuccessful due to lack of coordination and artillery support. The battle lasted for approximately two days and with support from the Greek side not materialising, while the Turkish forces were being continuously reinforced, Kouroupis ordered his forces to retreat toward Kerynia to defend the city.

Once close to the city, Kouroupis' men were encircled by a Turkish force. He told his men to disperse from a flank that had not yet been blocked by the Turkish army. The men refused to leave, but he ordered them to do so. Kouroupis and his second in command remained intending to provide cover for the retreating men. From this point, Kouroupis' whereabouts have remained uncertain.

== Disappearance and rescue attempt ==
Following the conclusion of the Battle of Pentemili beachhead, the fate of Kouroupis is unknown. On 27 March 1995, Greek reporter Petros Kasimatis wrote in Eleftheros Typos that a Greek intelligence agent in the guise of a fisherman had reported to the Greek intelligence agency that 6 prisoners of war were held at a prison in Bolu, Turkey and another 7 at a prison in Denizli. According to the Kasimatis report, the Greek intelligence officer was able to briefly communicate with the Greek officers at Bolu, after he bribed the Turkish guards.

According to Kasimatis, one of the detainees was Kouroupis. All detainees were in very bad condition. The Kasimatis report also mentions that following the intelligence received by the field intelligence officer who had posed as a fisherman, the Greek intelligence service organised a rescue attempt to free Kouroupis and other Greek prisoners at Bolu. During the rescue attempt, fire was exchanged and a Greek intelligence officer was killed. Since that time, the fate of Kouroupis is unknown. To date, the Greek government has not commented on the rescue attempt.

== Aftermath ==
Kouroupis' wife, Mary Kouroupis, is president of the Panhellenic Committee of Missing and Undeclared Prisoners (Greek: Πανελλήνια Επιτροπή Αγνοουμένων και Αδηλώτων Αιχμαλώτων). As president of the organisation, she visits Cyprus annually with the relatives of the disappeared to take part in protests against the Turkish invasion and continuing military presence on Cyprus. The protesters are flown to Cyprus with cargo planes provided by the Hellenic Air Force. In 2000, during her visit to Cyprus, Mary Kouroupis expressed her concern that DNA tests and exhumations should not be the only activities related to the disappeared of the conflict, but the discussion should also include those who may still be alive.

== Posthumous honours and legacy ==
On 12 December 2008, Colonel Kouroupis was posthumously awarded the rank of Lieutenant General of the Hellenic Army, the highest military rank of the Hellenic Army. In an interview to the Ta Nea newspaper in 2009, Kouroupis' wife, Mary Kouroupis, said that apart from the posthumous rank promotion, the Greek state has not provided further recognition to the fallen or disappeared in the conflict of 1974.

On 20 July 2014, on the 40th anniversary of the Turkish invasion of Cyprus, representatives of the sister cities of Kalamata and Aglantzia, took part in a ceremony at the metropolitan cathedral of Kalamata recognising the fallen citizens of Kalamata who were killed defending Cyprus during the conflict in 1974. During the eulogy, the municipality of Aglantzia announced the naming of one of its streets in honour of Pavlos Kouroupis. Pavlou Kouroupi Street, in the Aglantzia suburb of Nicosia is named after him. In Kalamata, the bust of Kouroupis has been erected in Panayiotis Foteas square in front of the Messinia Directorate.

== See also ==
- List of people who disappeared mysteriously (1970s)
