= Akpan Utuk =

Nigerian army colonel

- Disappeared: early 1970; Lagos
- Other name: E. A. Eutuk
- Occupation: colonel

Akpan Utuk was a colonel in the Biafran Army during the Nigerian Civil War (1967–1970), known for his strategic leadership and participation in several major battles. A native of the Ibibio ethnic group from southeastern Nigeria, Utuk joined the Biafran forces at the outset of the conflict in 1967 and rapidly ascended through the ranks. He commanded the Biafran 16th Division, notably leading efforts to defend and recapture the city of Owerri from Nigerian forces between 1968 and 1969. Utuk played a significant role in key engagements, including the defense of Owerri against General Benjamin Adekunle’s offensive in September 1968 and its eventual recapture after seven months of intense fighting. Following the fall of Owerri, he was ordered by Biafran President Odumegwu Ojukwu to retake the city and later to bolster defenses in Umuahia, which he successfully retook from Nigerian General Mohammed Shuwa in April 1969 after a brief occupation. Utuk’s military career concluded with the surrender of Biafra in January 1970, after which he was last documented attending a party in Lagos in early 1970, with no further public record of his activities or fate.

== Biafran War involvement ==
In 1967, with the start of the Nigerian Civil War Utuk, a native of Ibibio, joined the Biafran Army and quickly rose in ranks. Utuk is said to have fought at most of the large-scale battles during the war. When Utuk was made colonel he was put into command of the Biafran 16th Division to defend the city of Owerri from the oncoming Nigerian Army. When General Benjamin Adekunle decided to invade Aba instead of Owerri, he was pleased and decided to stay back and let Major Timothy Onwuatuegwu handle the Nigerians. After separate battles at Aba and Umuahia Utuk did not expect the Nigerian Army to arrive. On September 17, 1968, General Benjamin Adekunle attacked Owerri. Utuk and his men overpowered Adekunle's troops and forced them to flee to Oguta, but when Utuk arrived in Oguta he was met with heavy firepower from Adekunle's troops.

Utuk fled to Umuahia, leaving Owerri open to occupation. Immediately after the occupation of Owerri Biafran President Odumegwu Ojukwu had made himself a military general and ordered Utuk and Major Onwuatuegwu to invade and retake Owerri. After seven months of heavy fighting Utuk is able to recapture Owerri. After Owerri was retaken Ojukwu sent Utuk and Onwuatuegwu to Umuahia for defense. On March 22, 1969, Nigerian General Mohammed Shuwa invaded modern-day Abia State with 8,500 men. A large force of MiG-17's bombed the towns of Uzuakoli and Arochukwu, but did not damage any Biafran defenses. On April 22 Shuwa was able to break through Onwuatuegwu's line of defense and was able to take Umuahia. Utuk decided to invade the city and after four hours of Nigerian occupation, Utuk was able to retake the city.

== Disappearance ==
Nine months later, when Biafra surrendered to Nigeria, Utuk was last seen at a party in Lagos in early 1970.

== See also ==
- List of people who disappeared mysteriously (1970s)

== Sources ==
- Ani, Mz. Kevin (March 18, 2001). "Obasanjo: A Drooling Buffoon & His Warlike Idioms (II)". Journal of Igbo Affairs (Occasional Discussion). Archived from the original on January 15, 2006.
