= TCG Mareşal Fevzi Çakmak =

TCG Mareşal Fevzi Çakmak is the name of the following ships of the Turkish Navy, named for Mareşal Fevzi Çakmak:

- TCG Mareşal Fevzi Çakmak (D 349), ex-HMS Marne (D35), a M-class destroyer acquired by Turkey in 1959, scrapped in 1970
- TCG Mareşal Fevzi Çakmak (D 351), ex-USS Charles H. Roan (DD-853), a Gearing-class destroyer acquired by Turkey in 1973, scrapped in 1994
