= 1978 disappearance of Singapore social escorts =

1978 disappearance of five social escorts in Singapore

Locations
1 Clemenceau Avenue, Singapore

On 20 August 1978, five social escorts – 24-year-old Singaporean Diana Ng Kum Yim (Note: Her name is also spelled Diana Ng Kum Yip.) and four Malaysians – 22-year-old Yeng Yoke Fun, 22-year-old Yap Me Leng, 19-year-old Seetoh Tai Thim, and 19-year-old Margaret Ong Guat Choo, disappeared. On the day of their disappearance, the five women had been invited to attend a party by a man named "Wong", who claimed to be a businessman from Hong Kong, along with two of his associates who claimed to be Japanese. It was later found that the identities assumed by Wong and his two associates were fake. As of November 2023, the case remains unsolved and the five women have never been found.

== Background ==
Diana Ng Kum Yim, Yeng Yoke Fun, Yap Me Leng, Seetoh Tai Thim and Margaret Ong Guat Choo were five of ten women who worked as social escorts in an agency based in a flat in Clemenceau Avenue.

On 10 August 1978, ten days before their disappearance, Wong, who appeared to be in his forties, and his two Japanese associates met the women. The three men were said to be well-dressed and well-mannered, and were popular with the women in the agency. Over the next ten days, Wong regularly showered the women with gifts and took them out for shopping.

== Disappearance ==
=== Day of disappearance ===
On 19 August, the day before the women disappeared, Wong said they were throwing a party for a wealthy friend who had arrived in Singapore, and invited the five girls. The girls were promised $100 an hour for their time and a bonus of a diamond ring at the end of the party.

The following day, the women boarded a motor launch boat at Jardine Steps (now Harbourfront), going on a tour to places including Sentosa and the Merdeka Bridge, before disembarking and boarding the cargo ship. The boatman of the motor launch boat was the last person to see the women. After boarding the ship, they were never seen again.

=== Subsequent discoveries ===
On 26 August, about a week after the women disappeared, a severed right hand was found in the sea off Keppel Shipyard, which was near the location where the women boarded the cargo ship. The hand, which was decomposed and belonged to a young woman, showed signs of torture. The fingernails were manicured and contained traces of nail polish.

=== Theories ===
It was speculated that the women were kidnapped by a prostitution ring based either in Hong Kong or Japan. The Singapore police sought assistance from Interpol. Interpol confirmed that the passports of the three men, which they had used to check into hotels in Singapore, were forged. The Japanese National Police Agency was unable to identify the supposedly Japanese men from their aliases. Singapore police also sought the assistance of the Indonesian authorities as investigations showed that the cargo ship sailed for Indonesia.

Some also suspected that North Korean agents had been behind the kidnappings, as there had also been several women being kidnapped from places around East Asia, including Japan, Hong Kong and Macau, during the same time period of the late 1970s. This theory was supported by the testimonies of Choi Eun-hee, a South Korean actress who was kidnapped to North Korea, who heard that there was a Malaysian couple living somewhere in Pyongyang, and Charles Robert Jenkins, a United States Army deserter who entered North Korea in 1965, claimed that he had seen one of the five women, Yeng, in an amusement park in Pyongyang in 1980 or 1981.

== Aftermath ==
In 2004, Singaporean documentary series Missing documented the case in the third episode of the show's first season.

In 2017, the assassination of Kim Jong-nam in Malaysia by suspected North Korean agents resulted in renewed interest in the case of the missing social escorts.

== See also ==
- List of major crimes in Singapore
- List of people who disappeared mysteriously: 1910–1990
