= Fritz Stammberger =

German mountaineer, skier, and explorer

Friedrich "Fritz" Ludwig Stammberger
Personal information
- Nationality: German
- Born: 22 June 1940 Munich, Germany
- Died: Early 1980s? Afghanistan?
- Occupations: Mountaineer, Skier

Climbing career
- Known for: The highest ski descent, Makalu, Cho Oyu

Friedrich "Fritz" Ludwig Stammberger (born 22 June 1940) was a German mountaineer, skier, and explorer. He was a pioneer of mountain skiing and holds the record for the highest ski descent which he made down Cho Oyu mountain. Stammberger disappeared while scouting an expedition of Tirich Mir in Pakistan. His widow, Janice Pennington, published Husband, Lover, Spy after his disappearance with the help of her third husband Carlos de Abreu. The book claimed Stammberger was a spy working with the CIA and that ultimately led to his disappearance.

== Life ==
Stammberger was born in Munich, Germany. One of his earliest memories was of his home being bombed by allied forces during World War II. He immigrated to Aspen, Colorado in 1963. Stammberger took part in an expedition of Cho Oyu in April 1964. During the climb, his two mountaineering companions came down with high-altitude pulmonary edema (HAPE). Stammberger completed the summit of Cho Oyu without oxygen. When he returned to camp where his companions remained, he used skis to descend the mountain. His partners died before they could receive help.

Stammberger married model and The Price Is Right hostess Janice Pennington in 1974.

== Disappearance ==
Stammberger disappeared in October 1975 while scouting an expedition of Tirich Mir in Pakistan. A 1977 expedition was made by his climbing companions to find Stammberger.

Stammberger's widow, Janice Pennington, received military intelligence that Stammberger had joined the mujahideen and died in the early 1980s in Afghanistan. The CIA may have recruited Stammberger to gather information. Pennington's search for Stammberger continued until 1992 and led her to interview multiple members of U.S. and Soviet intelligence. The area of his disappearance is notable as it lies between the (then) Soviet Union, Afghan, and Chinese borders and was hostile during that time leading up to the Soviet-Afghan War. Pennington published the findings of her decades-long search for Stammberger in Husband, Lover, Spy.

== See also ==
- List of people who disappeared
