= Willi Koeppen =

Australian chef

- Born: June 22, 1929
- Disappeared: February 29, 1976 (aged 46); Olinda, Victoria, Australia
- Status: Missing for 50 years, 8 months and 8 days
- Known for: Celebrity chef, mysterious disappearance

Willi Koeppen (b. 22 June 1929–disappeared 29 February 1976) was a German Australian chef who is credited as being Australia's first celebrity chef, hosting the cooking program The Chef Presents on Channel Seven in Melbourne between 1957 and 1959 and owning the Cuckoo restaurant in Olinda, Victoria, within the Dandenong Ranges. Koeppen disappeared under mysterious circumstances in February 1976, with his ultimate fate remaining unknown.

== Early life ==
Willi Koeppen was born in Berlin, Germany, on 22 June 1929. He began his culinary career with an apprenticeship at the prestigious Hotel Adlon, and continued following his emigration to Australia in the 1950s when he became the executive chef at the Chevron Hotel in Melbourne. Koeppen married his wife, Karin Lantzsch, on 30 April 1957.

Around the time of their marriage, Koeppen and his wife purchased a café on Mount Dandenong Tourist Road in the town of Olinda, Victoria, located within the Dandenong Ranges. The couple converted the establishment into the Cuckoo, a Bavarian-themed smorgasbord-style restaurant. The Cuckoo's success made Koeppen a prominent figure in the Melbourne area, leading to Koeppen presenting The Chef Presents, a five-minute cooking program, on the local Channel Seven station between 1957 and 1959. Koeppen also presented a radio program on Melbourne station 3XY.

== See also ==
- List of people who disappeared mysteriously: 1910–1990
