= Clinton Avenue Five =

American presumed mass murderer victims

The Clinton Avenue Five are five young men who disappeared on August 20, 1978, in Newark, New Jersey. The name is derived from the street where they were last seen. The case eventually went cold.

The five teenagers were:

- Melvin Pittman, aka "Ricky", 17
- Ernest Taylor, 17
- Alvin Turner, 16
- Randy Johnson, 16
- Michael McDowell, 16

In November 2008, while in police custody on an unrelated charge and after a 13-hour interrogation, Philander Hampton confessed involvement in murdering the boys. Hampton said he and his cousin, local contractor Lee Anthony Evans, had lured the teenagers to his former Newark residence (256 Camden Street) with the promise of employment.

Angry at the boys for stealing marijuana from his home, Evans had Hampton hold two of them at gunpoint while he rounded up the other three. The boys were led to a third-floor bedroom closet at gunpoint and locked in. Evans then set the house on fire with five gallons of gasoline, and all five boys perished. After making this confession, Hampton led investigators to the site of the fire, where authorities searched the grounds for human remains using sonar equipment, but none were found.

== Arrests ==
On March 22, 2010, Evans and Hampton were arrested and charged with felony murder and arson. Each were held on $5 million bail at the Essex County Jail. Shortly thereafter, Rogers Taylor, a brother of victim Ernest Taylor, said that in 2008 Evans had confessed to him his involvement in the murder. Despite this confession, Judge Peter Vazquez noted Evans' strong ties to the community, his lack of a criminal record, and the prosecution's difficult case as reasons for his decision to lower bail from $5 million to $1.25 million and then to $950,000. Evans' family posted this amount in the form of three pieces of property. Evans was released from jail on August 20, 2010, the 32nd anniversary of the teens' murders.

== Trials ==
Philander Hampton pleaded guilty to the murders at his August 2011 trial and was sentenced to ten years in prison plus $15,000 in relocation expenses upon his release. He was released from custody on February 27, 2017.

In September 2011, Floria Turner-McDowell (not a relative of victim Michael McDowell), mother of victim Alvin Turner, had her son declared dead and filed a wrongful death suit against Evans and Hampton two months later.

Lee Anthony Evans represented himself at his November 2011 trial and was acquitted, officially closing the 33-year-old cold case. However, one of the victim's brother Rodgers Taylor, key witness in the case falsely accused a court watcher (Gary Ewing) of going to his house the "night before" and trying to intimidate Taylor about the case. After a small investigation by the Court Judge Costello it was determined that Rodgers Taylor was lying and fabricated the entire event.

In November 2013, Evans filed a lawsuit against the Essex County Prosecutor's Office (ECPO), the Newark police department, and United States Senator Cory Booker, claiming he was the victim of malicious prosecution and that his arrest was a political conspiracy to get then-Mayor Booker elected to a second term in office. State and city officials filed motions on January 22, 2015, to dismiss the complaint, stating that Evans had not provided a factual basis to conclude that any of the ECPO defendants had deprived him of his constitutional rights.

A third man has also been considered a suspect in the case. This was Maurice Woody-Olds, who died of natural causes in 2008. All three of the suspects are cousins.

== See also ==
- List of people who disappeared
