= Battle of Pentemili beachhead =

Battle during the Turkish invasion of Cyprus in 1974

Coordinates: 35.347°N 33.233°E

Battle of Pentemili
- Part of Turkish invasion of Cyprus
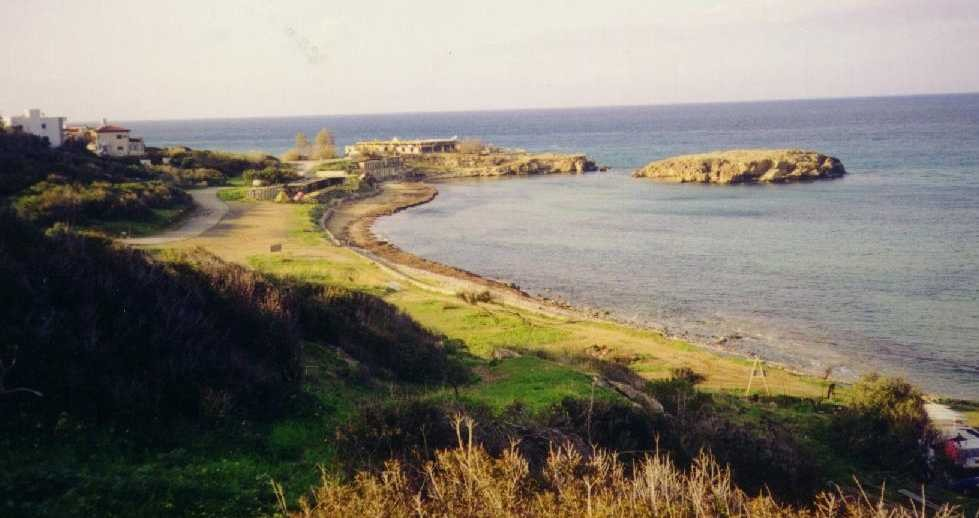
- Pentemili beach
| Date | 20–22 July 1974 |
| Location | Pentemili, Cyprus |
| Result | Turkish victory |

Belligerents
| Turkey | Cyprus |

Commanders and leaders
| (Turkey) Maj. Gen Bedrettin Demirel (Turkey) Lt. Gen Nurettin Ersin (Turkey) Brig Hakki Boratas (Turkey) Col. Karaoglanoglu † | Col. Konstantinos Kombokis; Lt. Col Pavlos Kouroupis (POW) |

Units involved
| (Turkey) Turkish Armed Forces; (Turkey) Turkish Army; 39th Infantry Division; 50th infantry regiment; (Turkey) Turkish Air Force; (Turkey) Turkish Navy | (Cyprus) Cypriot National Guard; 23rd ΕΜΑ medium tank battalion; 251st infantry battalion; 281st battalion; 286th mechanised battalion; 306th battalion; 316th reserve battalion; 326th battalion; 346th infantry battalion; 33rd commando battalion |

Strength
| First Wave: 3,500 soldiers 12 M101 howitzers 15 M47 tanks 20 M113 APCs; Second Wave: Unknown | Around 3,800 men in total |

Casualties and losses
| 77 killed 5–6+ M47 destroyed | Unknown; 5 T-34 destroyed 1 T-34 abandoned 8 BTR-152 destroyed 1 Daimler Dingo destroyed 2 M-H Mk-IVF destroyed 2 torpedo boats sunk |

Pentemili is the Cypriot beach where troops first landed on the morning of 20 July 1974 in the Turkish invasion of Cyprus. It is located 5 miles (8 km) west of Kyrenia, thus the name. For three days (20–22 July 1974), heavy fighting took place around the beachhead between Turkish and Greek Cypriot forces.

== 20 July ==
=== The landing ===
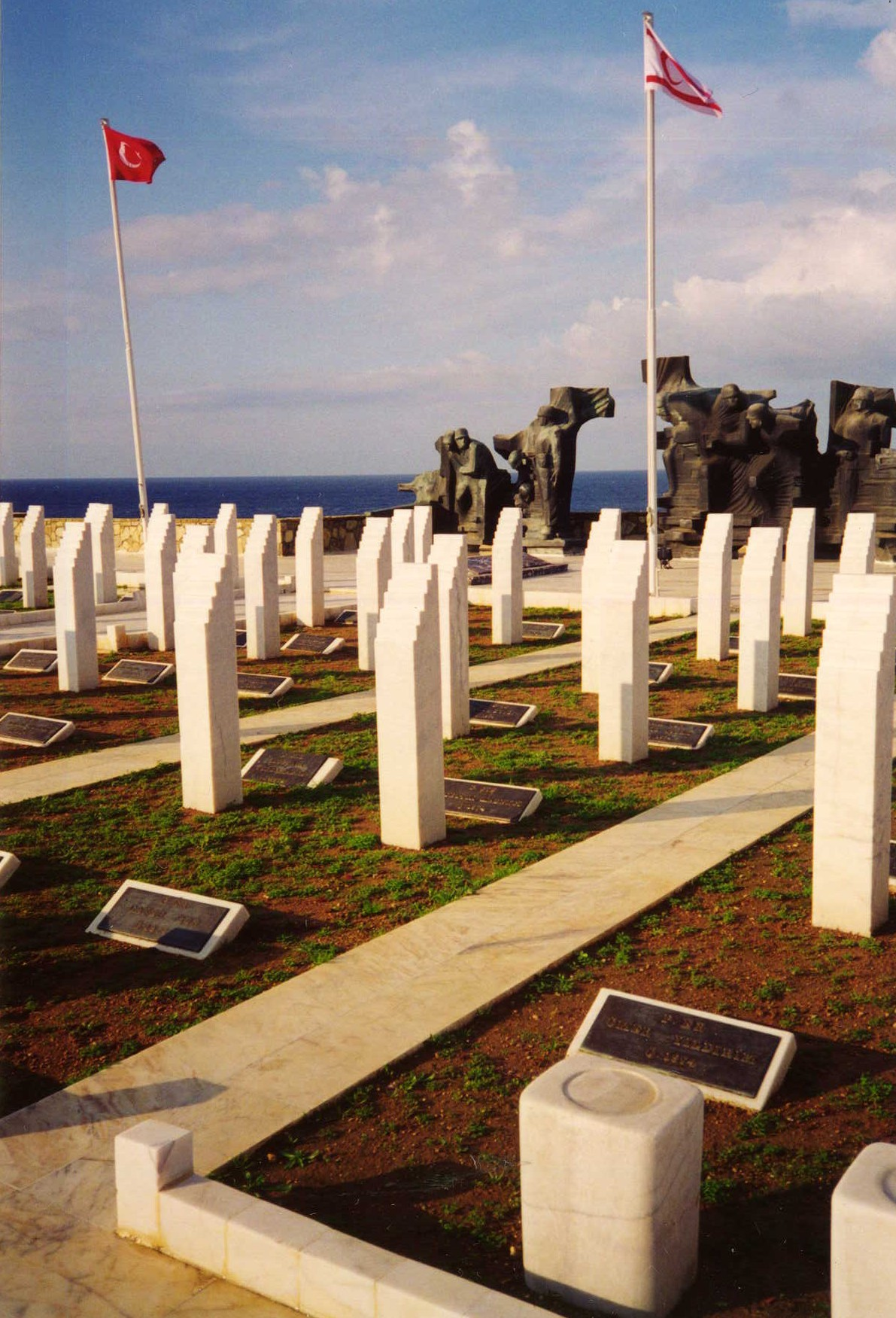
Monuments of the battle.

The Turkish task force set sail from Mersin port at 11.30 on 19 July. At about 05.00 on 20 July the fleet reached the northern coast of Cyprus. It initially missed the designated beach of Pentemili, and approached the unsuitable rocky beach of Glykiotissa, 3 km west of Kyrenia. The planned time for the beginning of the disembarkation was 05.30, but because of this mistake, the landing of the first crafts took place at 07.15. The landing finished at about 13.00.

The action began with the bombardment of Greek Cypriot positions by the Turkish destroyers TCG Mareşal Fevzi Çakmak and the TCG Kocatepe, which neutralized a Greek Cypriot coastal battery by 6:15.

The landed force was the "Çakmak" (Chakmak) one infantry marine brigade, consisting of 4 battalions with a nominal strength of 3,500 men, 12 M101 howitzers (105mm calibre) and 20 M113 armored personnel carriers. The task force also carried 15 M47 Patton tanks on the decks of the LST Ertugrul (L401), but those were unable to disembark, as the small size of the beach didn't allow the Ertugrul to approach. One unit of company size was also transported with helicopters to the hills south of the road. A total of roughly 3,000 men was unloaded on the Pentemili beachhead that day.

Two Cypriot torpedo boats were sent to intercept the approaching Turkish flotilla, but were destroyed by Turkish air support. The landing itself occurred under no fire, as there were no units of the Cypriot National Guard in the area. The objective of the landed forces was the port town of Kyrenia, some 8 km to the east of the beach. The Turkish forces, immediately after landing began expanding the beachhead, to give it a safe depth.

=== Greek-Cypriot resistance on the initial landing ===
The event of a such landing was predicted in the Cypriot National Guard's "Aphroditi 1973" plan. Realization of this plan was thus ordered by the National Guard High Command (GEEF) at 07.00.

The unit closest to the beach was the active 251st infantry battalion under Lt. Colonel Pavlos Kouroupis. The 1st company and the support company took position opposing the Turkish beachhead at about 09.30, while the 2nd and 3rd companies retained their positions against the Turkish Cypriot village of Templos. The 251st battalion was aided by a tank platoon of 5 T-34/85 tanks, of the 23rd tank battalion (based in Nicosia). The 1st company took positions immediately to the east of the Turkish beachhead, while the support company was positioned southwest of the beachhead, at the location Pikro Nero.

At 10.00 the battalion was ordered to attack the beachhead. The numerical imbalance forbade any serious success, however the attack seems to have initially surprised the Turkish units and caused some casualties, but they were quickly able to answer the fire, and stop any further Greek advance. Thus, the beachhead was limited to about 300m south of the road, and 1-1.5 km east of the landing beach. With the initiation of the fire exchange, a number of National Guard's artillery batteries began sporadic and generally inaccurate fire. Since these artillery units had no orders, some of them did not act at all, and those that did, did so under their commanders' responsibility.

At about 12.00 the Turkish forces attempted an advance to the east against the 251st bn, with support from their M113 APCs. The attack was repelled and two M113 were destroyed by the T-34/85, but the 251st bn had to give some ground retreating to the east. On the western side of the beachhead, the Turkish forces advanced to about 1 km, facing no resistance, and they stopped, as their objective lied to the east.

=== Mobilisation of the National Guard ===
Two Greek-Cypriot reserve battalions were seated in the area, the 326th in Kyrenia and the 306th in Agios Georgios. The 326th didn't mobilize at all, as its weapons were stored north of Karavas, across the Turkish beachhead, while the 306th did so, albeit very slowly, and with reduced strength. The National Guard High Command sent as reinforcements two battalions from Nicosia. Because the road from Nicosia to Kerynia was under the control of the Turkish Cypriot Gönyeli enclave, these units had to follow a longer route via the Panagra pass, west of the beachhead. These units were the 281st bn, minus a company, with the task of securing the Panagra pass, and the 286th mechanised infantry battalion, reinforced with 3 T-34/85, with the order of reaching the village Karavas, on the western flank of the Turkish beachhead.

Both units were attacked by the Turkish Air Force while passing through the village Kontemenos, and suffered heavy casualties, including 6 BTR-152V1 APCs and the commander of the 286th, who died of his wounds later. As a result both units had a morale collapse, and both were ordered to simply move to Panagra pass securing it and regrouping. Later in the afternoon, one company sized unit from the 286th bn, including the 3 tanks and an AT platoon (equipped with M40 recoilless rifles, calibre 106mm), was ordered to continue the advance. The remaining 281st bn was also later ordered to participate in a planned night attack.

The 316th reserve battalion from Morphou (west of the beachhead) was ordered to send the first two companies to be mobilized to Kyrenia, without knowing of the Turkish beachhead. As a result, at about 13.00 its 1st company was ambushed by Turkish forces, and suffered losses, including its commander. Realizing that the road to Kyrenia was cut, the battalion assumed defensive positions. At 16.30 the units from the 286th battalion arrived and united with the 316th. One T-34/85 was hit by Turkish AT fire, during a skirmish.

At about 20.00 a staff officer, of the National Guard High command, Lt. Colonel Konstantinos Boufas, arrived on the western sector, trying to coordinate the actions.

At 21.00 the 281st bn (still at Panagra pass) was ordered to reinforce the units on the western flank of the beachhead. It arrived at about 23.00. The reduced 281st, the two companies of the 316th, the company of the 286th and the AT and tank platoons, in total size, a reinforced battalion, was named "Boufas' battlegroup". A night attack was planned.

=== The night attack ===
The Greek-Cypriot counter attack was planned to begin at 02.30, with no artillery support. At 02.15 the commander of 316th bn was seriously wounded by Turkish mortar fire.

Units' positions early on the 21st's morning.

The Greek-Cypriot attack on the west commenced only with mortar support. It was carried out mostly by the 286th bn, which attacked on foot in a wedge formation, supported by machinegun fire by its BTR-152 vehicles. After overrunning the first Turkish lines and advancing in a depth of 500m, the attack stopped, under the heavy fire of the Turkish units, that had organised their defensive positions during the day. At its right flank, the 281st bn failed to overrun the first Turkish lines. The 316th bn remained in reserve. In order to avoid the action of the Turkish Air Force after dawn, the attacking units folded back to their starting positions.

On the eastern flank, the reserve 306th bn had not arrived yet. The 1st company of the 251st bn was ordered to attack, but under the dense Turkish fire it soon retreated to its initial position. The 306th arrived later and commenced its own attack, which did not succeed.

On the southern flank, a reserve battalion, which was created by surplus reservists (attendance of reservists in Nicosia was bigger than expected) called "Pantazis battalion" (after the name of its commander), arrived with no information of the enemy's location. At some point during the night, as it was marching northwards, its men realized that the battalion had entered the Turkish lines. After an exchange of fire, with no serious casualties, the battalion managed to exit the Turkish ambush, and assume defensive positions. The battalion lost a total of some 7-10 men killed and wounded, including its commander, who got shot in the arm. During the rest of the night, many of its reservists leaked southwards, back to Nicosia. The battalion eventually disbanded.

==== Colonel Karaoglanoglu's death ====
At about 03:00, the Turkish Colonel Karaoglanoglu, commander of the 50th infantry regiment of the Turkish army was killed in a villa, some 300m east of the Pentemili beach. The reason of his death officially was Greek mortar or artillery fire. According however to General Bedrettin Demirel's memoirs, the projectiles (two were fired), were 3.5 inch rockets, apparently from a M20 Super Bazooka. The holes that the projectile made, vertically on a vertical wall, and Demirel's implies about "fire discipline", point to the incident being a case of friendly fire. Additionally, the maximum range of a M20 Super Bazooka is ~300m, which, judging from the direction from which the projectile came, means that it was fired from within the Turkish beachhead.

== 21 July ==
On 21 July little happened around the Pentemili beachhead. The Turkish forces took some limited ground on the east during the noon. On the southern flank, where no Greek units existed, the Turkish forces advanced 500m to the roots of Pentadaktylos mountains, but stopped due to the raging fires that were burning after the bombardment of the area by the Turkish air force.

Away from Pentemili, in Mersin port, a second wave of Turkish forces was being prepared. It consisted mainly of a tank company (17 tanks) of the 39th divisional tank battalion and a mechanized infantry company of the 49th regiment with M113 APCs. It left Mersin at 13.30 on 21 July 1974, its destination was Pentemili. The second wave was named "Task force Bora".

== 22 July ==
=== Arrival of the second wave of Turkish forces ===
Task force Bora arrived at Pentemili beach at 09.00. Major General Bedrettin Demirel, commander of the 39th Infantry Division, had appointed Brigadier Hakki Boratas commander of Bora task force, while he assumed command of all the Turkish forces in the beachhead.

At arrival, Demirel, who knew of the cease-fire agreement, which would start at 17.00, sought to begin the attack against Kyrenia immediately. He noticed that the Turkish troops of the first wave were in poor shape and had low morale, being sleepless and disorganised, he however insisted that the attack start as soon as possible.

The attack, led by Bora task force followed by the 50th regiment, began at 11.00.

=== Changes on the Greek-Cypriot side ===
On the Greek-Cypriot side, the National Guard's High Command had noticed the inability of the 3rd Tactical Group (responsible for Kyrenia sector) to coordinate its forces and eliminate the Turkish beachhead and gave the command of all Greek forces west and east of the beachhead to Colonel Kobokis (commander of the Greek-Cypriot Special Forces). Kobokis planned for the reduced 33rd commando battalion to arrive as reinforcements. Additionally, a company of the 346th infantry battalion, mounted on improvised APCs (modified tracked artillery tractors, ATS-712) and a platoon with 4 3M6 (AT-1 Snapper) elements of the independent 120th weapons company were sent as reinforcements.

Between the night attack of 20–21 July and the morning of 22 July most of 306th battalion's men had retreated to Kyrenia exposing the flank of the 251st bn. At 09.00 the lightly equipped 33rd commando battalion (two companies with fewer than 150 men) arrived at the Agios Georgios village, where the 306th was supposed to be.

=== The attack on Kyrenia ===
At 11.00 the Turkish attack to the east, towards Kyrenia, began. The weight of the Turkish attack fell on the 33rd commando. After a brief fight, in which two Turkish M47 tanks were destroyed, the Greek line broke at about 11.30. The 33rd commando was ordered to disband and retreat in groups to Kyrenia. The elements of 251st and 306th battalions on the flank of the Turkish advance, had no ability to change the outcome of the battle, also retreated to Kyrenia. After pleads from Kobokis towards the commander of the 241st bn (stationed east of Kyrenia), elements of the 241st bn rushed to Kyrenia, trying to mount a defence line. Left of the 241st bn, some of the 306th bn's soldiers (reservists) took positions, while the rest gathered in the local football pitch. An additional 3 Turkish M47s were destroyed, but eventually the position of the 241st bn was overrun, while the commander of the 306th bn was captured. Clearing the town from remaining Greek pockets took many hours, until the morning of 23 July. During the attack, the commander of Bora force, Hakki Boratas, suffered a deep wound on his leg.

The Turkish commander Mj. Gen. Demirel, after leaving about half the Turkish force in Kyrenia to clear the town of Greek forces, ordered the rest of the force southwards to the direction of Bogaz, in order to unite the beachhead with Gönyeli enclave. At about 17.30 the armoured elements of Bora force united with the Turkish Cypriots and the Turkish paratroopers at Bogaz. At 18.00 Demirel met with 6th Corps' commander, Lt. General Nurettin Ersin, who had been paradropped into Gönyeli enclave.

Fighting continued after the cease fire, both in the town of Kyrenia and around the beachhead.

== See also ==
- Turkish invasion of Cyprus
- Military operations during the Invasion of Cyprus (1974)
- Reported Military Losses during the Invasion of Cyprus (1974)
- Cypriot National Guard
- Battle of Ledra Palace
- List of equipment of the Cypriot National Guard
- Cyprus dispute
