= Sattar Jabr Naser =

Iraqi writer

- Born: c. 1950s Iraq
- Disappeared: 1978

Sattar Jabr Naser (born c. 1950s, disappeared 1978) was an Iraqi writer, who disappeared in 1978.

== Biography ==
He was in his 20s when he published his book Reflections on the Book of Ali al-Wardi: Glimpses of the Modern History of Iraq in 1978. The book caused a stir in Baghdad's literary circles.

== Disappearance ==
It is known that Naser was detained and tortured by the security forces of Iraqi dictator Saddam Hussein. He was released after three months. Soon after his release, he was arrested for the second, and final time, after which he disappeared.

== Aftermath ==
Naser has never been seen since and his remains have not been found.

== See also ==
- List of people who disappeared
