= The Chef Presents =

- Genre: Cooking show
- Presented by: Willi Koeppen
- Country of origin: Australia
- Original language: English

Production
- Running time: 5 minutes; 15 minutes

Original release
- Network: HSV-7
- Release: 1957 – 1959

The Chef Presents is an early Australian television series, which aired from 1957 to 1959 on Melbourne station HSV-7, and was hosted by Willi Koeppen, who became a celebrity in Melbourne due to the series. At one point, the series aired in a 5-minute time-slot, later expanding to a 15-minute timeslot at 7:15 p.m. before being moved to 2:15 p.m., and finally aired at 4:00 p.m. In 1976, long after the series ended, Koeppen mysteriously vanished. One of the earliest cooking shows on Australian television, there is little information available on the series, and it is unlikely that any kinescope recordings exist of it.
