= Disappearance of Eileen McCarthy =

1971 missing persons case in Canada

Eileen McCarthy
- Born: 1948; Saskatchewan, Canada
- Disappeared: November 14, 1971 (aged 23); Edmonton, Alberta, Canada
- Status: Missing for 54 years, 10 months and 29 days
- Height: 5 ft 3 in (160 cm)

On November 14, 1971, Eileen McCarthy, a 23-year-old woman from Edmonton, Alberta, Canada, disappeared after leaving her house to go to the Misericordia Community Hospital, where she worked as a medical laboratory scientist. At around 6:30 a.m., she left her house at 118 Avenue and 124 Street to catch a bus to go to work. She was reported missing that day, and was never seen again. Her case remains the oldest lasting disappearance in Edmonton history.

== Background ==
Eileen McCarthy was born in 1948 in Saskatchewan, Canada, and had many sisters. McCarthy originally lived in North Battleford, Saskatchewan, before moving to Edmonton, Alberta about a year and a half before her disappearance. In June 1971, she married a man named Ian McCarthy. Prior to her disappearance, McCarthy was three months pregnant, and she had a job at Misericordia Community Hospital as a medical laboratory scientist. Her sisters described her as a quiet, shy, introverted person who was fascinated with poetry and baking.

== Disappearance ==
In the early morning of November 14, 1971, McCarthy was getting ready for work at her family residence at 118 Avenue and 124 Street. At around 6:30 a.m., she was at a bus stop, about a block away from her home to board a transit bus and arrive to work. According to police, McCarthy was wearing a brown and white coat with a white fur collar, a brown shoulder purse, and white hospital stockings. This was the last time she was ever spotted alive.

At around 5:30 p.m., after McCarthy did not return home that day, she was reported missing by her husband at around 5:30 p.m. McCarthy was described as 5 ft 3 in (1.60 m), tall, weighed 115 lb (52 kg), had brown eyes, brown hair that was dyed to blonde, and was originally from North Battleford, Saskatchewan.

Dianne Dawson, who was McCarthy's sister, received a phone call from her mother that she had suddenly disappeared. Dawson said in an Edmonton Sun interview that she began to cry, and her mother reassured her: "Don't worry, they'll find her.". Dawson said she had a worry that McCarthy would not be found. McCarthy was never found, despite multiple searches.

== Aftermath ==
A month after McCarthy's disappearance, Ian gave away many items that belonged to Eileen. He also drove to North Battleford and left a suitcase with her wedding dress outside her mother's house.

Dawson claimed to have visited McCarthy in September 1971, two months before her disappearance. Dawson was 20 at the time, and she claimed that McCarthy was "so happy because she had found out she was pregnant.", and said that Ian had wanted McCarthy to have an abortion. As time passed with no sign of McCarthy, her family began to suspect Ian was involved in her disappearance.

Lesley Richard, a woman who knew McCarthy, said: "She's always there. You kind of hope that there will be closure.", saying she still thinks about McCarthy daily. Dawson and Richard said they do not believe McCarthy is still alive, and that she is deceased, hoping that they can eventually know what happened to her.
