= Disappearance of Lynne Schulze =

1971 missing person case in the United States

Lynne Schulze
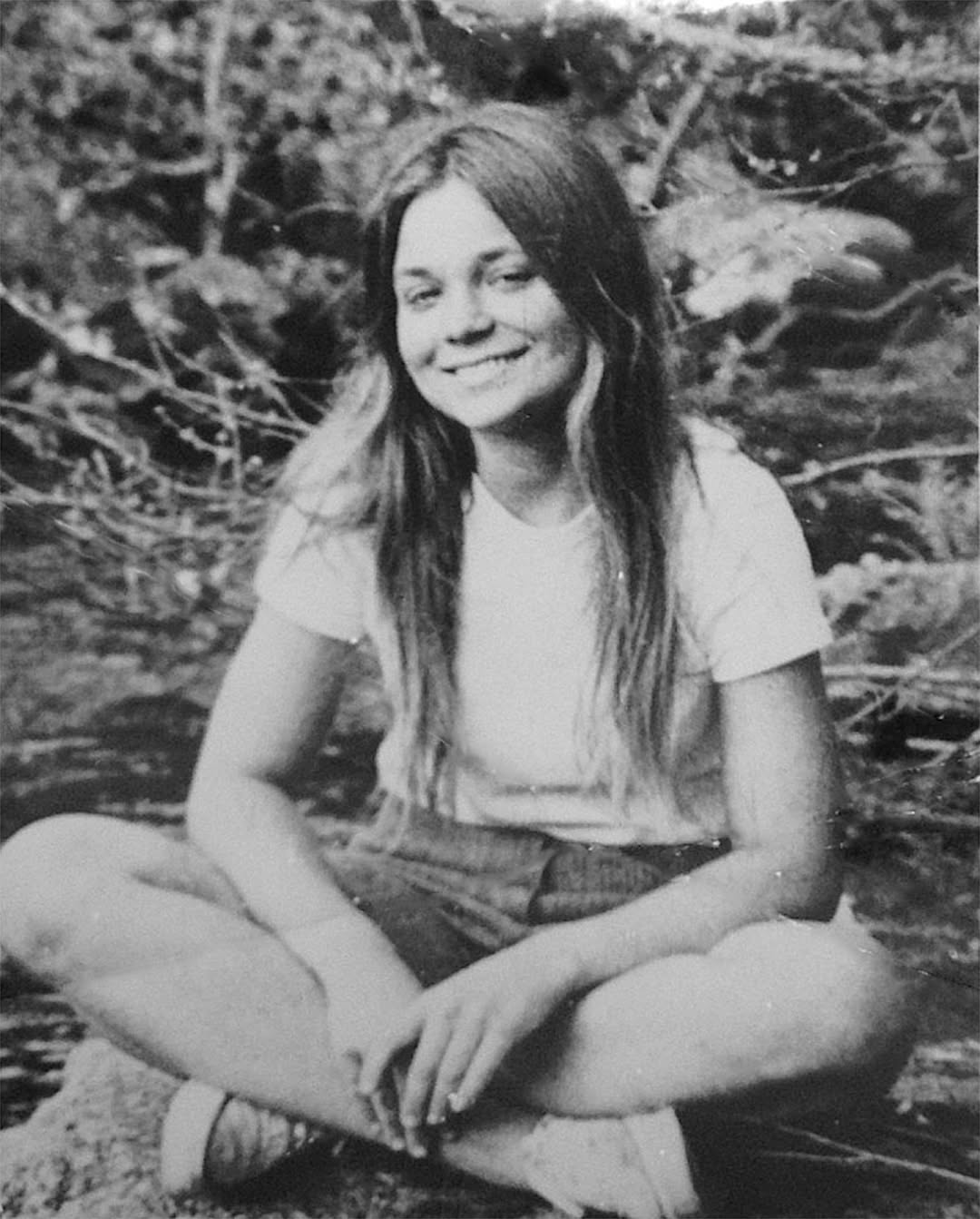
- Lynne Schulze circa 1971. Photo circulated by the VT State Police.
- Born: Lynne Kathryn Schulze; February 9, 1953
- Disappeared: December 10, 1971 (aged 18); Middlebury, Vermont, U.S.
- Status: Missing for 54 years, 9 months and 1 day
- Education: Middlebury College (Disappeared at end of first semester)
- Alma mater: Simsbury High School
- Height: 5 ft 3 in (1.60 m)

Lynne Kathryn Schulze (born February 9, 1953) is an American missing person who was last seen on December 10, 1971, in Middlebury, Vermont. The 18-year-old Schulze was attending Middlebury College, and disappeared during finals week of her first semester.

On the day of her disappearance, Schulze visited All Good Things, a health food store owned by suspected serial killer Robert Durst. She was last seen near the store, and police later said they considered her disappearance near Durst's store to be potentially important but not definitive. Schulze's disappearance has never been solved.

== Personal life ==
Schulze was born on February 9, 1953 to parents Otto and Virginia Schulze. She was the second of five children and had one older sister, one younger sister, and two younger brothers. Otto was a physicist and company executive and Virginia was a teacher.

The Schulze family lived in Wilton, Connecticut, Spring Garden Township, Pennsylvania, Nuremburg, Germany, and Simsbury, Connecticut during Schulze's childhood. The family moved to Simsbury in 1967 when Otto accepted a job with Combustion Engineering Company in Windsor, Connecticut.

=== Simsbury High School ===
Schulze attended Simsbury High School, the town's public high school. She was a member of the school's field hockey team and a 1970 National Merit Scholar. She enjoyed the outdoors, skiing, riding her bike, reading, and writing, and worked part time as a waitress. Schulze was also a member of a tight-knit friend group. She graduated from high school in Spring 1971.

=== Middlebury College ===
Schulze matriculated at Middlebury College, a highly selective liberal arts college, in Fall 1971. She lived in Battell Hall, the largest freshman dorm on campus.

While at Middlebury, Schulze frequently telephoned and wrote letters to her parents. While she was finding college courses more difficult than high school classes, she was not at risk of failing. She surprised her family with a visit home during Thanksgiving 1971, before returning to campus.

== Disappearance ==
On Friday, December 10, 1971 at around 12:30 PM, Schulze was seen buying and eating prunes at All Good Things, a health food store on Court Street in the town of Middlebury. The store was owned and operated by Robert Durst, a man who was later a convicted murderer and is a suspected serial killer.

Shortly before 1:00 PM, Schulze was walking to a final with a friend when she turned around to retrieve a favorite pencil from her dorm room. Schulze did not show up for the 1:00 exam.

At approximately 2:15 PM, Schulze was seen standing across the street from Durst's health food store. This was the last time she was ever seen.

Schulze left her college ID and driver's license in her dorm room, along with $7 in cash and a $25 check from her father. $185 was left untouched in her bank account. She was thought to have about $30 cash on her.

== Investigation ==
=== Initial investigation ===
Middlebury College notified the Schulzes of their daughter's disappearance on Wednesday, December 15, 1971 after she failed to show up for an exam on Tuesday, December 14. A missing person's report was filed, but the case was not widely advertised.

In January 1972, Schulze's disappearance was circulated in an article in The Burlington Free Press.

=== Later investigations ===
The Middlebury police publicly addressed Lynne Schulze's case in March 2015, more than 43 years after her initial disappearance. The press conference occurred after The Jinx, an HBO true crime documentary about Robert Durst, aired in February 2015. During the press conference, police also revealed that they had been looking into the potential connection between Durst and Schulze's disappearance since receiving a tip in 2012. They additionally stated they were now considering the case to be a criminal investigation instead of a missing person's case.

"We saw things that needed follow-up. An adult disappeared and (after all these years) we can assume wrongdoing. It is a potential homicide." - Tom Hanley, Middlebury Police Chief, March 2015

In December 2025, 10 years after the case was reclassified as a criminal investigation and 54 years after Schulze's disappearance, The Vermont State Police shared a Facebook post urging anyone with information pertinent to the case to contact them. The post stated that "extensive investigation has pointed towards there being foul play in her disappearance, although no sign of her have been found and she remains listed as a missing person."
