= Disappearance of John and Gianinna Colonna =

1974 children's disappearance in Puerto Rico

John and Gianinna Colonna
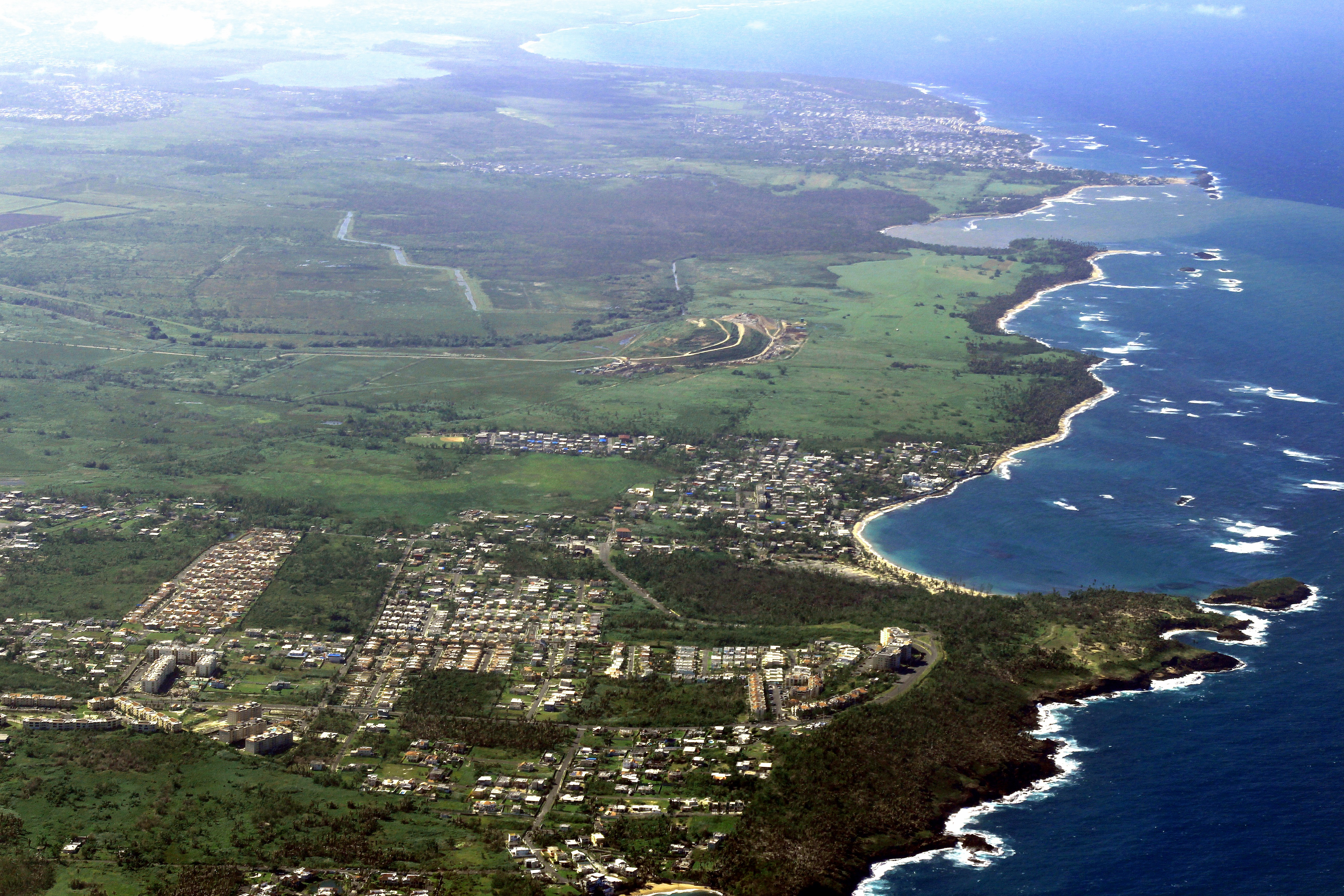
- Luquillo
- Born: John Colonna; February 19, 1962; Giannina Maria Colonna; April 19, 1963
- Disappeared: May 5, 1974; Luquillo, Puerto Rico
- Known for: Missing persons

The Disappearance of John and Giannina Colonna is a missing children's case that took place in Puerto Rico in 1974. The case remains open.

== People involved ==
John Gianot Colonna Aponte (born February 19, 1962) was twelve years old at the time of his disappearance. His sister Giannina Maria Colonna Aponte (born April 19, 1963) was eleven. The two were close; they shared friends and enjoyed each other's company. The Colonna siblings are Puerto Ricans of French descent. Their father, John Colonna Sr., who died in 1982, was French and American.

== Disappearance ==
On May 5, 1974, the siblings disappeared en route to meet a friend at Luquillo beach. After the children had disappeared, their mother, Noemí Aponte, contacted the friend, an adult male, but he said that he had not seen the children that day.

== Investigation ==
Police believed that the siblings were abducted based on a suicide note left by a man named Tomás Rodriguez, who had moved to Miami shortly after the disappearance. In the note, he said that he knew details about the disappearance, including a plan to collect a ransom of $72,000 by the unidentified kidnappers. Rodriguez was a businessman, as well as a neighbor of the Colonna family when the disappearance took place.

According to information given by Noemí Aponte in 2013 to the Puerto Rican newspaper Primera Hora, the FBI had disclosed to her in 2002 that they had found a woman who in Mayaguez whom they believed to be Gianinna Colonna. DNA testing was conducted in 2005, with samples taken from her and the exhumed body of her husband John. She was informed that the Colonna children were not John Colonna Sr.'s biological children, a claim she denied. "John, my husband, was the love of my life, my first love, my first man, so how are they going to come and tell me the children aren't his?", she said. "[The investigators] wanted to solve the case at my expense, from my pain, and that is disgusting". It was also determined that Noemí was not in Mayaguez when they were investigating the woman they believed to be Gianinna.

In 2012, Alberto Grajales, the director of Interpol in Puerto Rico, said that the Forensic Sciences Institute certified that John was not the father of the Colonna children and that there was no reason to publicly apologize to Noemí. He also said that if Noemí proceeded as planned, to declare her children legally dead, the case would be archived by his agency.

Noemí died on April 2, 2023. The case remains unsolved.

== See also ==
- List of people who disappeared mysteriously: 1910–1990
- List of Puerto Ricans
