= Disappearance of Edward and Stephania Andrews =

American missing persons case

- Date: May 15, 1970; 56 years ago
- Location: Chicago, Illinois, U.S.
- Type: Disappearance
- Outcome: Both declared legally dead in 1978
- Missing: Edward Pope Andrews; Stephania Rynak Andrews

Edward Pope Andrews (born 1908) and Stephania Rynak Andrews (born 1908) were a married couple who disappeared in 1970 after leaving a party in downtown Chicago. The couple and their vehicle were last seen in the vicinity of the Michigan Avenue Bridge near the Chicago Loop. The case was widely publicized by local newspapers and multiple theories have emerged as to the couple's fate. The whereabouts of their car and themselves has never been discovered, and the case has long gone cold.

== Background ==
At the time of their disappearance, the Andrews resided in Arlington Heights. Edward Andrews was a manager and bookkeeper for a Chicago manufacturer, and Stephania was a credit investigator. Both were planning to retire within the year.

== Disappearance ==
On the evening of May 15, 1970, the Andrews attended a cocktail party at the Sheraton-Chicago hotel, located at 505 North Michigan Avenue. About 9:30 PM, the hotel's parking garage valet and manager observed Edward Andrews "staggering" as he approached his vehicle. When exiting the garage, the Andrews' vehicle sideswiped a door and valet observed Stephania Andrews seated in the front passenger seat, crying. Edward Andrews then proceeded onto the lower deck of Michigan Avenue where he illegally drove south in the northbound lanes toward the Michigan Avenue Bridge and Wacker Drive. This was the last reported sighting of the Andrews and their vehicle, a 1969 Oldsmobile.

The Andrews failed to attend a scheduled dinner party the next night and neither reported to work the following Monday.

== Investigation ==
Police theorized that the couple drowned when Andrews attempted a U-turn on the lower level of the Michigan Avenue bridge and accidentally drove into the Chicago River through an area unprotected by a guardrail. Police searched the river twice during the spring and summer of 1970 using dragging equipment, sonar, and divers, but failed to locate their vehicle.

According to Edward Andrews’ coworkers, he became ill during lunch on the day he vanished and remained sick for the rest of the afternoon. Attendees at the cocktail party reported that Andrews appeared ill, but told his wife that he was hungry and wished to leave the party in order to get a meal. Police speculated that Andrews may have been intoxicated or suffering from a disorienting illness when he drove out of the hotel's garage.

Police discounted robbery as a theory since the couple carried little cash or valuables at the time they vanished and their bank accounts and credit cards showed no activity in the months that followed.

The Andrews left behind all of their personal belongings in their home. Friends and neighbors described the couple as conscientious and unlikely to leave town without notifying their employers and family.

== Later developments ==
In 1971, additional searches of the Chicago River and adjacent areas of Lake Michigan were carried out at which time a sonar technician stated he was “95% sure” the car was not in the area. In 1973, an Arlington Heights detective speculated that a barge might have crushed the Andrews' car into the river bottom or pushed it out into the lake. In 1974, a tip led police to carry out underwater searches in the harbor near Navy Pier but no further evidence was found.

In 1975, a psychic became involved with the case and stated that the couple had been murdered on Chicago's South Side. In 1976, another psychic claimed that the Andrews were murdered and their bodies and their car were submerged in a lake.

The couple was declared legally dead in 1978.

In 1994, the case was revived when a tipster informed police that the couple had been murdered and then submerged with their car in a Green Oaks, Illinois pond. Police searched the pond and found no evidence of the Andrews or their car.

== See also ==
- List of people who disappeared
