= Cinema Politica =

Canadian non-profit organization

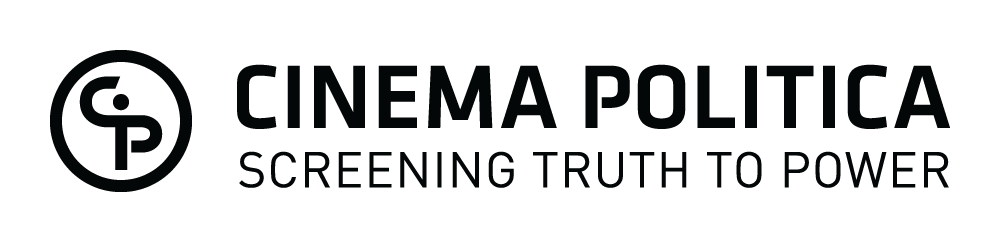
CINEMA POLITICA is an international network of nearly 100 locals screening documentary films

Cinema Politica (CP) is a non-profit media arts organization based in Montreal with nearly 100 screening locations all over the world (as of September 2011). Each chapter ("local") screens independent political documentaries for free or by donation to audiences, with guest filmmakers and speakers often invited to participate. CP claims to be the "largest volunteer-run, community and campus-based documentary-screening network in the world."

Cinema Politica started in Montreal at Concordia University in 2003 as an incorporated non-profit network and organization with several chapters throughout Canada and abroad. Cinema Politica is funded through arts council grants, membership fees, distribution revenues and audience donations.

Most CP locals are based on campuses in Canada and Europe, but the organization has locations off-campus (community locals) and in other parts of the world including Latin America and Africa.

== Cinema Politica's Mandate ==
Cinema Politica states that its mandate is to support "alternative, independent, and radical political film and video, and the artists who dare to devote time, passion and resources to telling stories from the margins. We program works that feature under-represented characters and tell stories which confront and challenge conventional fiction and documentary narratives."

== Supporters ==
CP is mainly funded by the Canada Council for the Arts, membership fees from locals, fundraising and donations from audience members. CP has partnerships with the following distributors: the National Film Board of Canada, Mongrel Media, Women Make Movies, les Films du 3 mars, Java Films, and others.

== Cinema Politica awards ==
=== The Cinema Politica Audience Award ===
Each year Cinema Politica nominates the 10 most-screened films in the network for the CP Audience Award. Audiences members across the network choose the winner.

Previous winners:

- 2008: Roadsworth: Crossing the Line
- 2009: American Radical: The Trials of Norman Finkelstein
- 2010: Dreamland

=== The Alanis Obomsawin Award for Commitment to Community and Resistance ===
This award is presented to a Canadian filmmaker who "has shown a commitment to community and resistance in documentary filmmaking." The award is named after the prolific National Film Board director Alanis Obomsawin. The first Alanis Award was given to John Greyson in March 2011.

== Cinema Politica Board of Directors and Advisory Committee ==
Cinema Politica is governed by a board of directors, and is aided in their work by the members of an advisory committee. Currently, they are made up of:

BOARD OF DIRECTORS

- Michael Lithgow // Writer; Video Artist; PhD candidate in Media Studies (Carleton)
- Inês Lopes // PhD, Education consultant; Founder of CP-UQAM
- Liz Miller // Filmmaker (The Water Front); Assoc. Professor (Concordia)
- Thomas Waugh // Professor in the Mel Hoppenheim School of Cinema (Concordia)
- Ezra Winton // Director of Programming and Founder - Cinema Politica; Editor - Art Threat; PhD candidate in Media Studies (Carleton University)

ADVISORY COMMITTEE

- Tracey Deer
- Sean Farnel
- John Greyson
- Sylvia Hamilton
- Peter Wintonick
- b.h. Yael
