= Manolis Bikakis =

Greek military personnel (1954–1994)

Sergeant Manolis Ioannis Bikakis
- Μανώλης Ιωάννης Μπικάκης
- Born: Manolis Ioannis Bikakis; March 10, 1954; Amygdalos, Crete, Kingdom of Greece
- Died: October 22, 1994 (aged 40); Greek National Road 8a, Greece
- Burial place: Amygdalos, Crete, Greece
- Military career
- Allegiance: Greece
- Branch: Hellenic Army
- Rank: Sergeant
- Unit: Alpha Raider Squadron
- Conflicts: Turkish Invasion of Cyprus; Operation Niki; Battle of Agios Dometios
- Other work: Construction worker

Manolis Bikakis (Greek: Μανώλης Μπικάκης; March 10, 1954 – October 22, 1994) was a Greek commando during the Turkish invasion of 1974.

== Biography ==
Manolis Ioannis Bikakis was born on 10 March 1954 in Amygdalos, Heraklion, Crete. He completed primary school in the village of Stoli in Heraklion. After fulfilling his military service, he worked as a construction worker. He was married with two children when he died on 22 October 1994.

== Turkish Invasion of Cyprus (1974) ==
At the age of 20 Bikakis joined the special forces as part of his mandatory military service. He served with the Greek Alpha Raider Squadron (later renamed to 35th Raider Squadron) which was secretly airlifted to Cyprus, on a Noratlas type aircraft, for Operation Niki during the night of 21 July 1974 and in the early morning of 22nd. Commander of the Alpha Raider Sqadron and head of the operation was Georgios Papameletiou. The Alpha Raider Squadron had the objective to reinforce the ELDYK and Cypriot National Guard units against the Turkish invaders and was assigned to the Nicosia International Airport. During the second phase of invasion launched on August 14, 1974, the Squadron was dispersed confronting the invading Turks in the area of Ayios Dhometios (Battle of Agios Dometios) where Bikakis had been ordered to provide anti-tank cover with a 90 mm M67 recoilless rifle.

Defense of Hill 190
- Part of Battle of Agios Dometios
Date	16–19 August 1974
Location	Hill 190, Agios Dometios, Cyprus
Result	Greek victory, Turkish advance halted

Belligerents
ELDYK: A' Commando Squadron	(Turkey) Turkish Armed Forces: (Turkey) Turkish Army; 5th Armored Brigade; 50th Infantry Regiment

Commanders and leaders
Commando Manolis Bikakis	(Turkey) Brigadier General Sabri Demirbağ (Turkey) Colonel Eşref Bitlis (Turkey) Colonel Mustafa Katırcıoğlu

Strength
1	400–1,200 (1 tank company and 1 infantry battalion)

Casualties and losses
0	24+ (6 tanks destroyed)

Bikakis along with one of his fellow Cretan servicemen, Bihanakis, had taken positions in a hill in the outskirts of Nicosia when Turkish aircraft started their bombardment at dawn. The hill was bombed and the two soldiers thought each other dead. Bihanakis managed to reach the rest of the squadron and report Bikakis's death, but Bikakis had survived.

Armed with only a PAO (recoilless rifle) and 8 rounds for it, he refused to abandon his position. Opposing him was a Turkish tank company supported by an infantry battalion. Bikakis shot at the first tank that was approaching, destroying it and spreading panic among the surprised Turks. His position was now revealed to the enemy, thus he could not afford to back down. He reloaded and for a second time he aimed, shot and destroyed the second battle tank.

Still alone in his trench, now with 6 rounds remaining, he reloaded yet again and managed to destroy a third tank with his third round. Ultimately he destroyed 6 enemy tanks with the same number of rounds. This way he contributed to the deterrence of the Turkish troops marching towards the Cypriot capital. After destroying the 6 tanks, Bikakis focused on the retreating Turks, who found refuge in a nearby abandoned building. Bikakis spotted them and shot at the building with his two remaining missiles. One hit the ground floor and another the second floor, destroying the building and killing an unknown number of Turks. At the same time the rest of his squadron, under Papameletiou, secured the Nicosia airport and prevented the Turkish plan of capturing it.

For the next four days, Bikakis would walk around enemy territory, fighting with whatever weapons he managed to salvage from nearby hills, until he managed to locate his squadron.

== Later life ==
Bikakis never received any praise for his feats while he was alive. His commander's proposition to award him the Gold Cross of Valour was overlooked. Bikakis himself never contested that and instead, after fulfilling his military service, became a construction worker and had a family and kids.

He died in a car accident in 1994, while driving on the Athens-Patra National Highway, at the age of 40.

The Greek government finally awarded him with the Medal of Gallantry in 2015, 41 years after the war had ended, acknowledging his bravery for destroying 6 Turkish tanks while single-handedly engaging the advancing Turkish forces.
