= Battle of Agios Dometios =

1974 Turkish assault in Cyprus

- Part of Turkish invasion of Cyprus
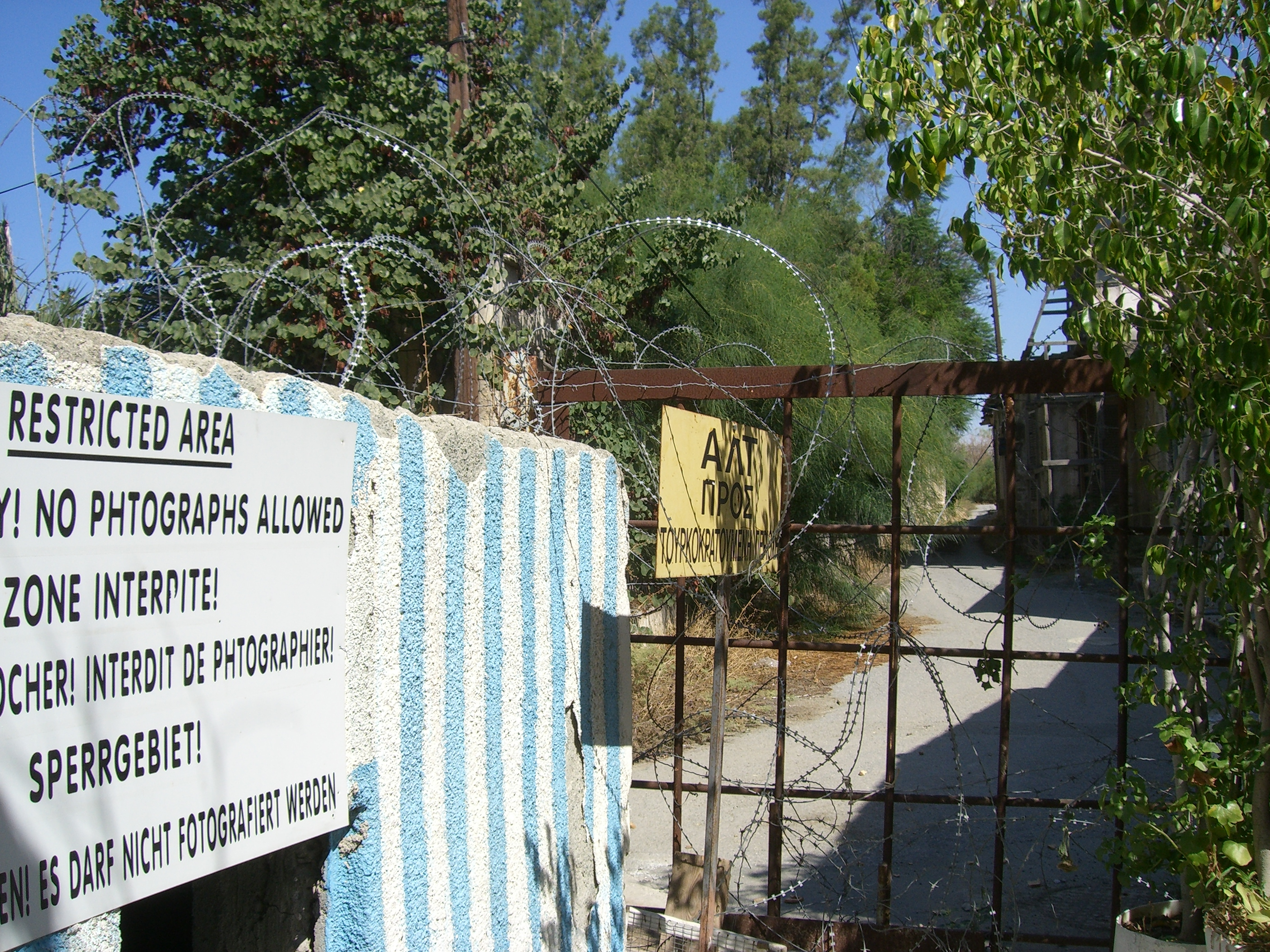
Date	14–17 August 1974
Location	Agios Dometios, Cyprus 35.172°N 33.329°E
Result	Greek victory
Territorial changes	Turkish Forces capture ELDYK camp; Turkish Forces fail to capture suburb of Agios Dometios

Belligerents
Turkey (Northern Cyprus) Turkish Cypriot fighters	Cyprus; Greece

Commanders and leaders
(Turkey) Brigadier General Sabri Demirbağ (Turkey) Colonel Eşref Bitlis (Turkey) Colonel Mustafa Katırcıoğlu	(Cyprus) Colonel Georgios Azinas (Cyprus) Major Dimitrios Alevromagiros; Lieutenant Colonel Panagiotis Stavropoulos; Commando Manolis Bikakis

Units involved
(Turkey) Turkish Armed Forces: (Turkey) Turkish Army; Turkish Force in Cyprus (TURDYK); 5th Armored Brigade; 50th Infantry Regiment; (Turkey) Turkish Air Force; (Northern Cyprus) Turkish Cypriot militias: Turkish Resistance Organisation	(Greece) Hellenic Armed Forces: Hellenic Force in Cyprus; A' Commando Squadron; (Cyprus) Cypriot National Guard: 211 Infantry Battalion; 212 Infantry Battalion; 336 Reserve Battalion

Strength
7,000+	1,850+

Casualties and losses
Unknown	83+ killed or injured

The Battle of Agios Dometios (Greek: Μάχη του Αγίου Δομετίου), also known as Battle of ELDYK (Greek: Μάχη της ΕΛΔΥΚ) was an engagement between Greek, Greek Cypriot, Turkish and Turkish Cypriot forces between 14 and 17 August 1974. It was part of the Attila-2 (Second phase of the invasion) operation as described by Turkey and the wider battle for Nicosia as described by Cyprus.

The battle resulted in a Greek victory, as the Cypriot and ELDYK forces succeeded in repelling the Turkish invaders from the suburb of Agios Dometios.

== Initial Turkish assault ==
In the early morning on 14 August 1974, Turkey violated the ceasefire agreement signed on 23 July by massing an assault against on all sides, attempting to take Morphou, Famagusta, the Mesaoria, Karpasia and Nicosia in an operation they called, Attila-2. In Nicosia, at approximately 5 am, the Turkish Air Force bombarded National Guard targets alongside the ELDYK camp in Agios Dometios and additional shelling by Turkish artillery on the area.

Somewhere around 7,000 were used to take the ELDYK camp and the area surrounding it with approximately 700 Turkish forces moving on the ELDYK camp on the first day with additional M48 tanks arriving by 15 August (second day of the fighting) in order to assist the Turkish infantry forces.

== Greek-Greek Cypriot defense ==
The 336 Reserve Battalion was in charge of defending the area between Ledra Palace and the ELDYK military camp, encompassing around 3.5 kilometers.

Some 319 ELDYK soldiers were in charge of defending their camp and the area around it, such as the grammar school. On 15 August, Lieutenant Colonel Stavropoulos requested assistance against the Turkish M-48s but was only offered a few Marmon-Herringtons which were mostly ineffective against the M-48s. The fighting around the ELDYK camp continued until 16 August, and on that day the fiercest fighting took place with heavy bombardments against the camp from the Turkish air force and constant barrages by artillery and tanks making it almost impossible for the Greek soldiers to do anything due to the lack of both air and ground support with the ELDYK camp eventually falling into Turkish hands and ELDYK suffering more than 83 casualties as a result of the fighting.

In the morning of 16 August, whilst also attacking the ELDYK camp, the Turkish armed forces also tried breaking through the defensive lines and fighting especially hard to take the Imprisoned Graves, using all available air and land assets and Turkish infantry using narrow roads to try and outflank Greek Cypriot units there however in this case were unsuccessful.

The Turkish Regiment in Cyprus (TURDYK), the 2nd battalion, 50th Infantry Regiment attempted to re-encircle Nicosia airport after taking the grammar school however were met with resistance from the 212 Infantry Battalion and A' Raider Squadron, which is reportedly where Manolis Bikakis took out multiple Turkish tanks and as such, prevented a further advance into Agios Dometios.

On 17 August, although the ceasefire was in place, the Turkish military tried to advance near the old Church of Agios Pavlos however were unsuccessful and after the attempt, fighting had since ceased on the front.

== Aftermath ==
Though the Turkish assault on the ELDYK camp was eventually successful, the Greek-Greek Cypriot forces successfully defended most of Agios Dometios-Agios Pavlos and preventing key areas such as the Imprisoned Graves, from falling into the Turkish hands.

There have been several claims by former ELDYK fighters about Turkish war crimes after the battle such as decapitation of dead soldiers' bodies and the dead also being thrown into mass graves.

== See also ==
- Battle of Tillyria
- Battle of Pentemili beachhead
- Battle of Ledra Palace
