= Battle of Ledra Palace =

1974 event of the Turkish invasion of Cyprus

- Part of Turkish Invasion of Cyprus
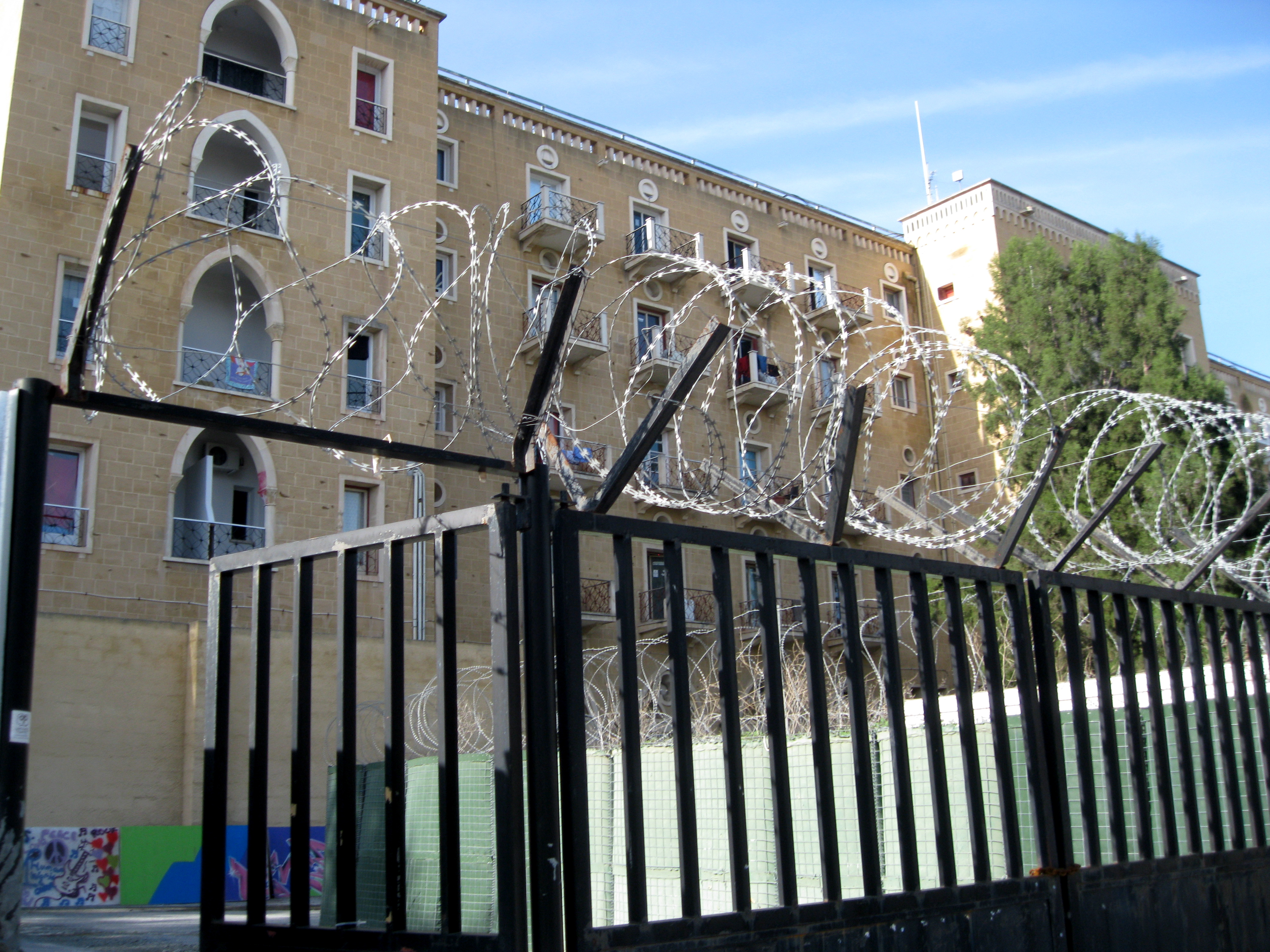
Date	20 July – 16 August 1974
Location	Nicosia, Cyprus 35°10′40″N 33°21′17″E
Result	Greek victory

Belligerents
Turkey	Cyprus	United Nations

Commanders and leaders
(Turkey) Hasan Pasias	(Cyprus) Major Demitrios Alevromageiros (Cyprus) Captain Nikolaos Ligoustianos (Cyprus) Sub-lieutenant Andreas Magnitis	(United Nations) (United Kingdom) Brigadier Francis Henn (United Nations) (Canada) Colonel Clayton Beattie

Units involved
Turkish Armed Forces: Turkish Land Forces; Turkish Air Force	Cypriot National Guard: 211 Infantry Battalion; Reserve Officers Company	UNFICYP

Strength
300–1,000	Approx. 200	Unknown

Casualties and losses
Unknown	1+	None

The Battle of Ledra Palace was fought during the Turkish invasion of Cyprus in July 1974.

Ledra Palace is located in Nicosia district, about 2.6 km north of the Presidential Palace and on the Green Line. During the invasion, and indeed from the beginning of the conflict on 20 July, Ledra Palace was a point of vital importance for the Turkish Armed Forces and its possible occupation would have likely led to the destruction and dissolution of the Republic of Cyprus.

== 20 July ==
The Reserve Officers Company of the National Guard, a few days before the invasion, had been based in the camp of the 11th tactical group, which was located near the ELDYK camp and Nicosia International Airport, and on the day of the invasion (20 July), it received orders to take hold of Ledra Palace and the surrounding area before the Turkish military.

Soldiers from the 1st Company of the 211th Infantry Battalion went to the roof of the hotel and mounted a 50mm machine gun and when Turkish paratroopers began to descend, they began to fire on them.

The Turkish military, at 8 a.m. began to hit the national guardsmen and the surrounding area with bullets, mortar shells, and artillery and this continued until the end of the day with UNFICYP men conveying threats by the Turks that if the national guard did not leave, they would drop napalm bombs on them the Greeks refused to leave. By the end of the day, the first National Guardsmen had been killed.

== 21 July ==
On 21 July, in the morning hours, the battle started again with the national guardsmen firing against the Turkish military who were fortified in the surrounding houses. During the battle, a Greek Cypriot opened fire on the Turkish mast with the Turkish flag (and therefore fell) to mislead the other Turkish soldiers that the outpost was captured (to send reinforcements). Some Turkish soldiers also tried to trap the national guardsmen allegedly surrendering in order to for the advancing national guardsmen to be trapped and killed.

After this incident, the Turkish side tried through the United Nations (UNFICYP), to have a cease-fire, again, with the threat that if the Greeks did not leave, they would drop napalm bombs but again the national guard refused to leave.

The soldiers from the National Guard then received a call from the government to leave the hotel but refused because they were afraid that if they left, the hotel would be taken over by the Turkish military and therefore made a plan with the government which included the National Guard troops leaving the hotel and for it being turned over to UNFICYP.

== Aftermath ==
Turkey did not try to seize the hotel and therefore, the hotel has remained under the control of UNFICYP since then with various meetings and events held there either by the Republic of Cyprus or the United Nations.

== See also ==
- Turkish invasion of Cyprus
- Cypriot National Guard
- Battle of Pentemili beachhead
- United Nations Buffer Zone in Cyprus
- United Nations Peacekeeping Force in Cyprus
