= 35th Raider Squadron =

Greek special forces unit in Cyprus

- 35η Μοίρα Καταδρομών
- Active: 1974–present
- Country: Greece; Cyprus
- Branch: Hellenic Army
- Type: Special forces
- Role: Raiding Mountain warfare Special reconnaissance
- Size: 319
- Garrison/HQ: Maleme, Crete, Greece
- Patron: Saint George
- Engagements: Turkish Invasion of Cyprus: Operation Niki; Battle of Nicosia Airport; Battle of Agios Dometios

Commanders
- Notable commanders: Major Georgios Papameletiou

The 35th Raider Squadron, (Greek: 35η Μοίρα Καταδρομών; known until 12 August 1974 as A' Raider Squadron, Greek: Α' Μοίρα Καταδρομών) is a special forces unit of the Hellenic Armed Forces permanently stationed in Cyprus.

Headquartered in Maleme, Chania and largely composed of Cretans, the squadron took part in the Battle of Agios Dometios and in the Battle of Nicosia Airport, successfully repelling Turkish offensives both times.

== History ==
The 35th Raider Squadron was formed from parts of A' Raider Squadron, which was dispatched to the island during the Turkish invasion of the island, the only support Cyprus received from Greece during the conflict. The unit came to the island on board Nord Noratlas planes, but with one of them being shot down in friendly fire, resulting in over 30 casualties. Following the airlift operation, the commandos took part alongside an element of the Cypriot 33rd Raider Squadron, other Cypriot National Guard units and units from the Hellenic Force in Cyprus in the battle of Nicosia Airport, preventing it from being taken over by the Turkish military.

On August 12, the unit was renamed from A' Raider Squadron to 35th Raider Squadron.

From August 14, the unit took part in the battle of Agios Dometios suburb, fighting in and around the Gregoriou Grammar school area blocking the Turkish military advance past the Grammar school. This is also the battle where Manolis Bikakis (Aka the "Greek Rambo"), fought and destroyed at least four Turkish armoured vehicles, further delaying the Turkish Military.

The 35th was called to respond to the riots outside the US embassy which resulted in shots being fired however Commander Papameletiou refused, citing it was not a special forces job to respond to embassy issues rather military police.

== See also ==
- Cyprus problem
- Hellenic Armed Forces
- Turkish invasion of Cyprus
