= Dionysios Arbouzis =

20th century Greek Army officer

- Διονύσιος Αρμπούζης
- Born: c. 1912; Molaoi, Kingdom of Greece
- Died: 30 January 1987; Third Hellenic Republic
- Burial place: First Cemetery of Athens
- Education: Hellenic Military Academy
- Military career
- Allegiance: Kingdom of Greece; Third Hellenic Republic
- Branch: Hellenic Army
- Rank: General
- Unit: Greek Expeditionary Force in Korea
- Commands: ELDYK; Chief of the Hellenic Armed Forces
- Wars: World War II: Greco-Italian War; Battle of Greece; Greek Civil War; Korean War
- Other work: Minister for Northern Greece

Dionysios Arbouzis (Greek: Διονύσιος Αρμπούζης) was a Hellenic Army officer who rose to the rank of general and held the position of Chief of the Hellenic Armed Forces in 1974–1976, after the fall of the Greek military junta. Arbouzis, with more than 13 years of combat experience, participated in World War II, in the Greek Civil War and the Korean War.

Arbouzis graduated from the Hellenic Army Academy and participated as an officer of the Greek Army in the major conflicts of World War II in Greece: Greco-Italian War (1940–1941), Battle of Greece (1941), as well as the Greek Civil War (1946–1949). During the Greco-Italian War, he participated, as battalion commander in the 33rd Infantry Regiment, in the Battle of Hill 717 during the Italian spring offensive.

He is also notable as a commander of the Greek Expeditionary Force in Korea during the Korean War, as the first commander (as a colonel, in 1960) of the Hellenic Force in Cyprus, and as a commander of the Hellenic Army Academy (as a major general, in 1965–1966). In 1967, at the time of the 21 April coup, he was Second Deputy Chief of the Hellenic Army General Staff, and was well known for his dedication to the constitutional order. On the day of the coup, he was arrested by the plotters and dismissed from the army by the new regime. He was recalled to active service, promoted to full general and installed as head of the armed forces after the fall of the junta in August 1974, and held the position until 1976. In 1977, he served for a month (21 October – 28 November) as Minister for Northern Greece under Konstantinos Karamanlis in the caretaker cabinet during the 1977 legislative elections.

He died in 1987 and is buried in the First Cemetery of Athens, on February 3.
