= 1st Raider–Paratrooper Brigade =

- 1η Ταξιαρχία Kαταδρομών-Αλεξιπτωτιστών
- Camp flag of the 1st Paratroopers Brigade
- Active: 1946–present
- Country: Greece
- Branch: Hellenic Army
- Type: Special Forces
- Role: Airborne forces; Amphibious warfare; Mountain warfare; Raiding; Reconnaissance; Combat search and rescue; Personnel recovery
- Size: 3 Regiments
- Part of: I Infantry Division; NATO Response Force; Balkan Battlegroup
- Garrison/HQ: Rentina, Macedonia
- Nicknames: Prasinoskoufides (Green Berets); Lokatzides (Mountain Raiders)
- Mottos: Who Dares Wins; Ο Tολμών Nικά; O Tolmon Nika
- Engagements: World War II: Tunisia Campaign; Dodecanese Campaign; Greek Civil War: Dekemvriana; Turkish invasion of Cyprus; War in Afghanistan

Commanders
- Current commander: Brig. Gen. Georgios Kapralos
- Notable commanders: Andreas Kalinskis

The 1st Raider–Paratrooper Brigade "El Alamein" (Greek: 1η Ταξιαρχία Kαταδρομών-Αλεξιπτωτιστών «Ελ Αλαμέιν», romanized: 1 Taxiarchia Katadromon-Alexiptotiston "El Alamein", abbrev. 1η ΤΑΞ ΚΔ-ΑΛ), is a brigade-sized formation of elite Greek light infantry and special operations forces.

The formation is more commonly referred to as the Raider Forces (Greek: Δυνάμεις Kαταδρομών, romanized: Dynameis Katadromon), and a soldier belonging to the Brigade a Raider (Greek: Kαταδρομέας, romanized: Katadromeas).

== History ==
=== Sacred Squadron ===
The nucleus of the Raider units was the Sacred Squadron (Ieros Lochos), a Free Greek unit of commandos attached to the Allied 1st Special Air Service (1 SAS) Brigade during the Second World War. Its members consisted of mainly officers and NCOs who had fled to North Africa after the fall of Greece to Axis forces. After its formation in 1942, the Sacred Squadron, along with a unit of Free French troops and British commandos, formed the basis of L Detachment, a component of the SAS which specialised in hit-and-run raids on Axis airfields, ports and fuel dumps throughout North Africa.

The Sacred Squadron was later transferred to the Greek theatre of operations, where they recaptured several eastern Aegean islands from Axis forces. After the liberation of Greece from German occupation, a proposal was made for the reformation of the Hellenic Armed Forces under British guidance with the proposal including the establishment of a small, highly trained, special warfare unit.

=== Mountain Raider Companies ===
When the Greek Civil War broke out in 1946, the Greek Government formed a special warfare unit, primarily to help Greek royalist capture territory which was still in the hands of communist-inspired guerrillas. Mountain Raider Companies (Greek: Λόχοι Ορεινών Καταδρομών, romanized: Lochoi Oreinōn Katadromōn), commonly known by their acronym, LOK (ΛΟΚ), were formed on 20 January 1947 and began operations almost immediately in Greece's mountainous terrain.

The I Raider Squadron was created in August 1947 and took part in civil war operations in Thessaly, Central Greece, Epirus, West Macedonia and Euboea. The IV Raider Squadron was established at the port city of Volos, Thessaly in December 1947 and operated in all regions of Greece during the Civil War. The V (E), Raider Squadron was formed in April 1949 and took part in Civil War operations until December 1949. By 1949, the Raider squadrons were so successful against the communist insurgents that the Raider Forces Command was expanded to two brigades. III Raider Squadron, also formed in 1949, was redesignated as an amphibious-capable unit in 1963, while I Raider Squadron, disbanded at the end of the Civil War, was reactivated in 1968, and later re-formed as an amphibious unit in 1974, after the Turkish invasion of Cyprus.

In the late-1960s, the Greek Central Intelligence Service (KYP), and the CIA became secretly involved with training and arming the Lokatzides. A tool of the KYP and CIA, a LOK detachment played a part in the 1967 Greek coup d'état by storming and securing the Army General Staff buildings at Cholargos, Athens.

=== Raider Forces ===
After the fall of the Papadopoulos regime, and the establishment of a democratic republic in 1975, the LOK were dismantled and re-formed as the Raider Forces (Greek: Δυνάμεις Kαταδρομών), and placed under the command of the Hellenic Army's Special Forces Command (Greek: Διοίκηση Ειδικών Δυνάμεων). A further restructuring of the Greek Army in 1996 saw the amalgamation of all Raider Forces units into the current brigade formation.

== Uniform and unit insignia ==
1st Raider–Paratrooper Brigade soldiers wear the standard-issue 'Greek Lizard' camouflage battle dress uniforms (BDU) of the Hellenic Army. Members of the elite Special Paratrooper Detachment (ETA) and the VII Amphibious Raider Squadron (Ζ′ ΜΑΚ) may occasionally wear non-standard issue BDUs depending on mission requirements.

All members of the brigade wear the unit insignia depicting a winged sword, representative of the "deadly, silent and swift" nature of special forces operations. A scroll runs across the sword and wings with the motto "Who Dares Wins" (Ο ΤΟΛΜΩΝ ΝΙΚΑ), a tribute to the Free Greek Special Forces that served with the 1 SAS Brigade during World War II. The unit flash is emblazoned with ΔΥΝΑΜΕΙΣ ΚΑΤΑΔΡΟΜΩΝ ('Raider Forces'). While on operations, low-visibility patches are worn.

== Structure ==
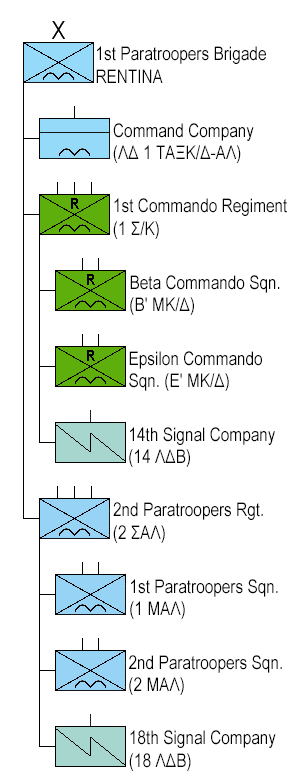
Structure 1st Paratroopers Brigade

- 1st Raider–Paratrooper Brigade in Rendina, Macedonia
  - 1st Raider Regiment (1ο ΣΚ)
    - II Raider Squadron (Β΄ ΜΚ)
    - V Raider Squadron (Ε΄ ΜΚ)
    - 14th Signal Company (14 ΛΔΒ)
  - 2nd Paratrooper Regiment (2ο ΣΑΛ)
    - 1st Paratrooper Squadron (1η ΜΑΛ)
    - 2nd Paratrooper Squadron (2η ΜΑΛ)
    - 18th Signal Company (18 ΛΔΒ)

=== Special Paratrooper Detachment ===
Members of the Special Paratrooper Section (a HALO/HAHO-qualified long-range reconnaissance patrol (LRRP) unit are all professional NCOs and officers. They are the brigade's contribution to the Defence Ministry's DESAA, the Multi-Branch Operational Rapid Response Command, along with the Hellenic Navy's DYK, and the Hellenic Air Force's 31 MEE. The formation is also known as Force Delta (Dynami Delta).

== See also ==
- Operation Niki
- Manolis Bikakis
