= Ayios Dhometios =

Ayios Dhometios: Άγιος Δομέτιος (Greek); Aydemet (Turkish)
- Municipality
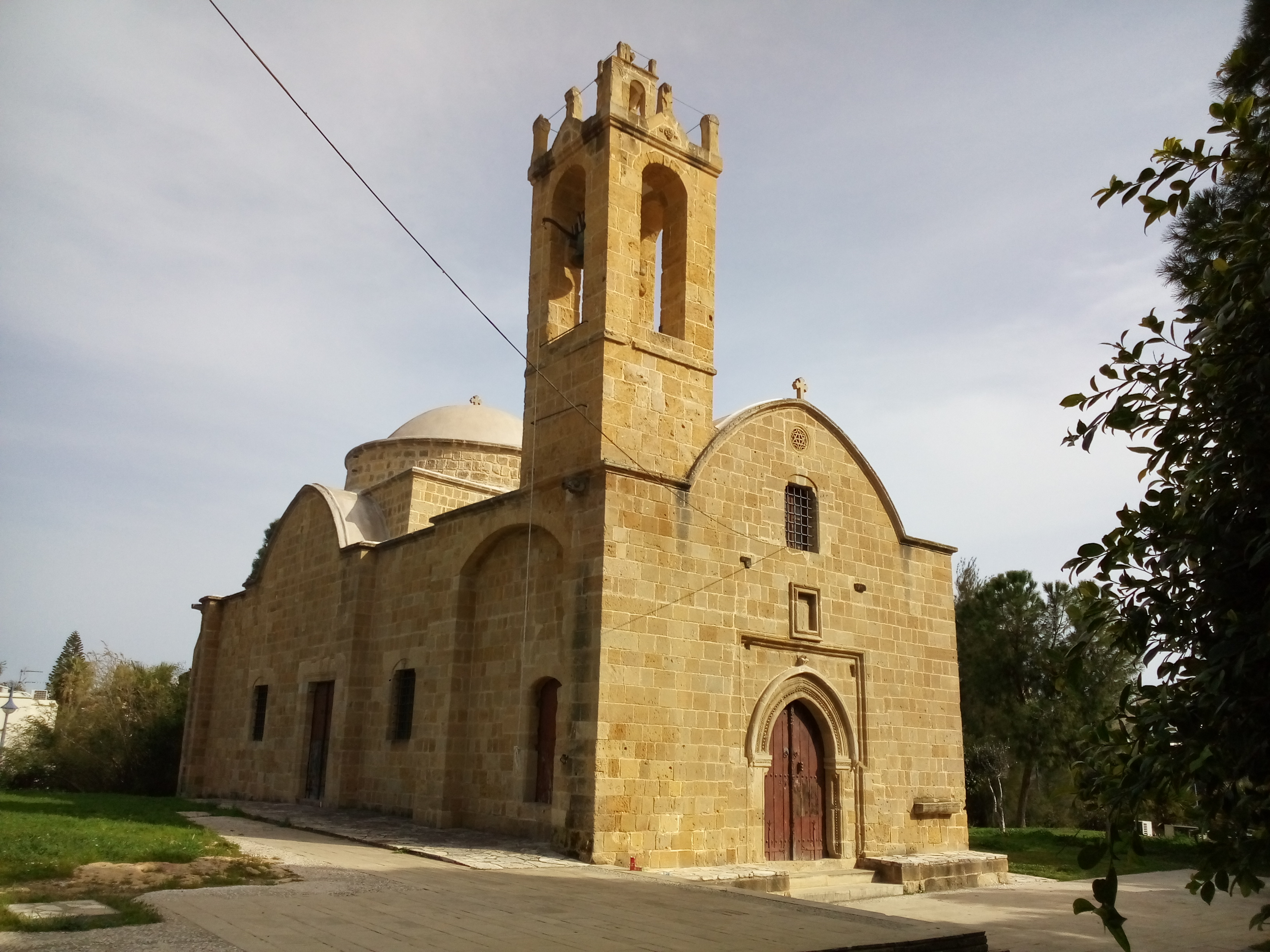
- Ayios Dhometios church
- Interactive map of Ayios Dhometios
- Location within Cyprus Location within the Eastern Mediterranean Location within the European Union Location within Asia
- Coordinates: 35°11′0″N 33°20′0″E
- Country: Cyprus
- District: Nicosia District
- Urban area: Nicosia

Area
  - Municipality: 4.18 km^{2} (1.61 sq mi)

Population (2011)
  - Municipality: 12,456
  - Density: 2,980/km^{2} (7,720/sq mi)
- Time zone: UTC+2 (EET)
  - Summer (DST): UTC+3 (EEST)
- Website: http://www.dad.org.cy/

Ayios Dhometios (Greek: Άγιος Δομέτιος or Άη Δεμέτης; Turkish: Aydemet) is a suburb west of the Cypriot capital Nicosia. It has a population of 12,456 (2011 census) making it one of Cyprus's biggest municipalities. A portion of Ayios Dhometios with a population of 2,314 (as of 2011) is under Northern Cypriot control.

Since 2003 and the opening of the checkpoint, Agios Dometios is the site of the island's most important checkpoint in Cyprus, through which thousands of Greek Cypriots and Turkish Cypriots pass through daily.

== History ==
Ayios Dhometios, has existed since ancient times as a small village, 4 kilometres (2.5 mi) west of Nicosia. Mention of Ayios Dhometios comes from as early as the Lusignan period (1191–1489). The town is named after Saint Dometius of Persia who originated from Persia in the 4th century AD and became a Christian later in his life. He lived in a cave in Mesopotamia and converted many people into Christianity. Roman emperor Julian accused Dometius of tricking people, so Dometius answered the Emperor that all of these harmless people visit him freely and he could not just send them away. Julian was offended by his answer and ordered his death. Dometius was stoned to death in 362. The church of Ayios Dhometios was built in the 17th century and is dedicated to the Saint. It's built on a small hill and is one of the town's main attractions.

At the first British census in 1881, the population was 430. This had grown to 10,055 at independence in 1960, including 7,672 Greeks, 73 Maronites, 66 Armenians, 2,065 British people and 1 Turkish person.

During the 1974 Turkish invasion of Cyprus, Agios was the scene of heavy fighting in which the Cypriot National Guard and Hellenic Force in Cyprus fought the Turkish Armed Forces and Turkish Resistance Organisation.

== Ayios Pavlos ==
The parish of Ayios Pavlos is located around the church of Saint Paul. The Ayios Dhometios junior high school is also located in Ayios Pavlos. It is also considered an area within Ayios Dhometios, covering its northern area.

== Administration ==
Ayios Dhometios has been a municipality since 1986 and the mayor is elected directly by the people in mayor elections that take place every five years. The elections of December 17, 2006 saw mayor Andreas Hadjiloizou re-elected to office. He was previously elected to office in 1996 and 2001. Costas Petrou has been the mayor since defeating Hadjiloizou in the December 2011 elections.

The part of Ayios Dhometios (known as Aydemet or Metehan in Turkish) under Northern Cypriot control is currently administered as a Mahalla or neighbourhood of the Nicosia Turkish Municipality.

Ayios Dhometios is divided into the civil parishes or neighbourhoods of St. George and St. Paul. Their populations in 2011 were 9,267 and 3,189 respectively.

The Koinotarch (communal president) of St. George has been Christodoulos Ioannou since 2015 and that of St. Paul has been Stavros Xyrichis since 2018.

== Interconnectors ==
In Ayios Dometios are headquarters of EuroAsia Interconnector, EuroAfrica Interconnector, Quantum Cable, Quantum Corporation and Quantum Energy. The EuroAsia Interconnector is a 2000 MW electricity interconnector between Greek, Cypriot, and Israeli power grids via a 1,520 km (940 mi) long submarine power cable. EuroAfrica Interconnector is 2000 MW interconnector between Greek, Cypriot, and Egypt's power grids via a 1,710 km (1,060 mi) long submarine power cable. The Quantum Cable is a planned 7,700 km (4,800 mi) submarine communications cable system that will connect Asia with Europe through the Mediterranean sea. It will connect Cyprus, Greece, Israel, Italy, France and Spain.

== Interesting sites ==
=== Ayios Dhometios checkpoint ===
The opening of the buffer zone between the Republic of Cyprus and the de facto Turkish Republic of Northern Cyprus in April 2003 set off debate about opening additional checkpoints both for cars and on those foot along the Green Line. One of the areas selected was the end of Demokratias Avenue in Ayios Dhometios. An agreement was reached and in late April 2004 in which both sides started separate works building a road and placing control buildings. On May 23, 2004, the checkpoint opened to the public, and on the first day thousands of Greek and Turkish Cypriots, on both sides passed through the check point. Since then, Ayios Dhometios has become the main passing point for vehicles, with thousands of Greek and Turkish Cypriots passing through every day.

=== Churches ===
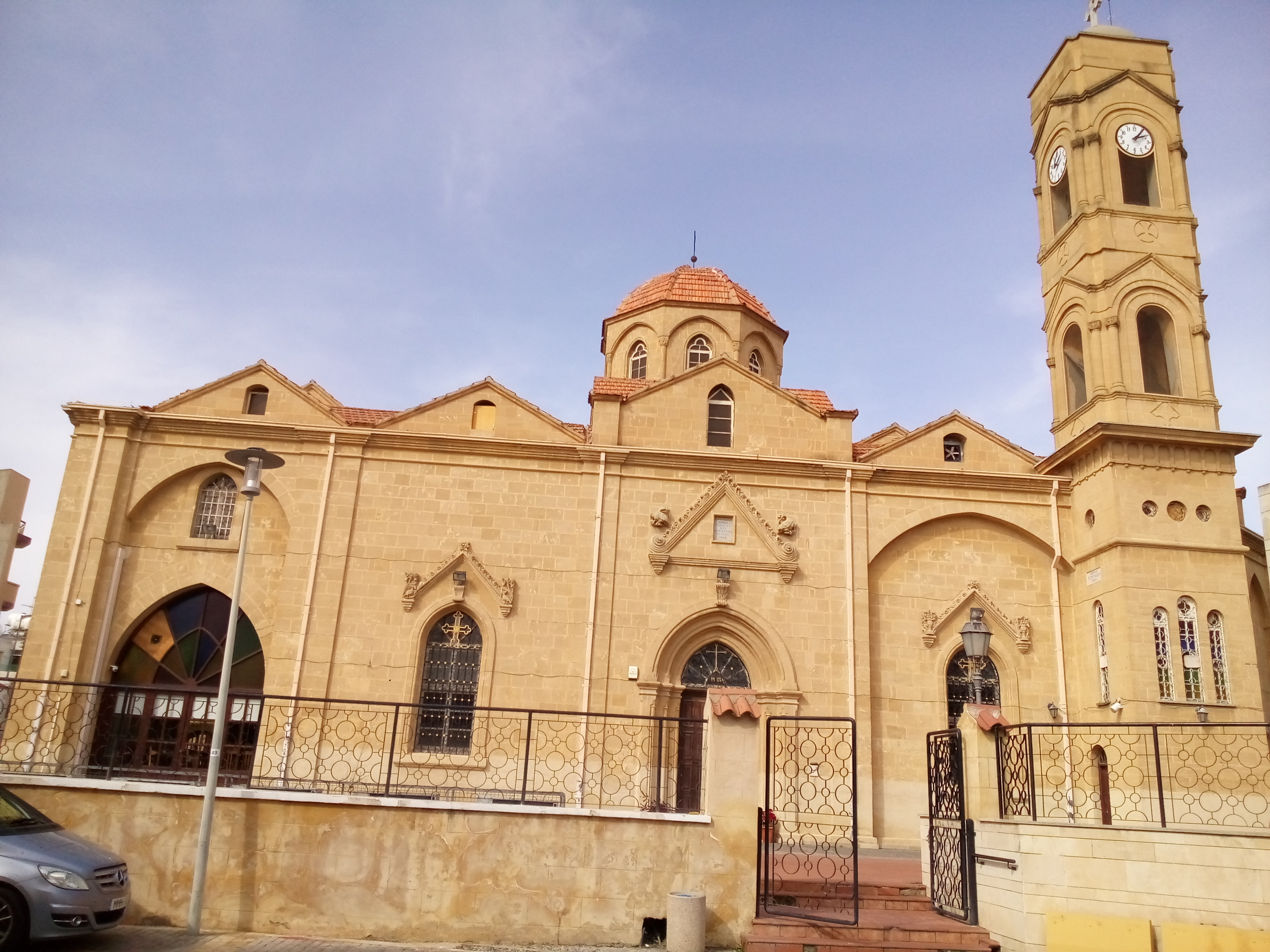
Saint George church in Ayios Dometios

Ayios Dhometios is currently home of three Christian-Orthodox churches. The Ayios (Saint) Dhometios church is the oldest of the three and is built on a hill overlooking the old part of town.

The Saint George church is located on Gregoris Afxentiou Avenue and is Ayios Dhometios's main church. It's dedicated to Saint George who according to the legend killed a dragon with a spear. The third church of the town is Saint Paul's church and is the newest of the three. It was built in the late 1980s to replace the ageing church situated next to it which is dedicated to the same saint.

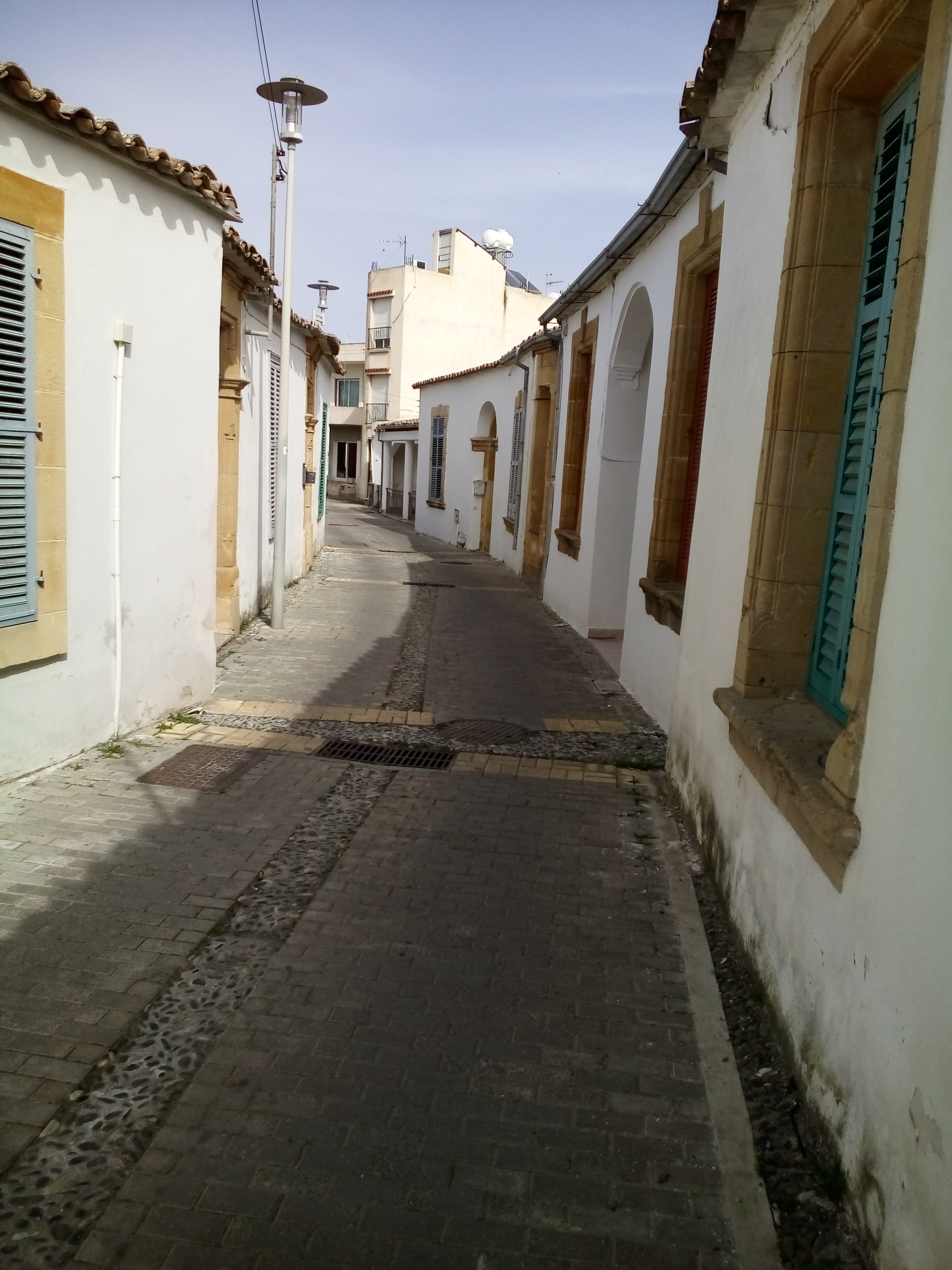
Old narrow street, preserved how it once was in old Ayios Dometios

=== Parks ===
Ayios Dhometios has four parks. The Missing in Action park, which is dedicated to the Ayios Dhometios residents that went missing during the Turkish Invasion and are still MIA and is located opposite the Coca-Cola factory, the Ayios Dhometios park which is located near the checkpoint into the occupied area, the Ayios Pavlos park which is near the Junior High and the newest built park which is dedicated to the National Guard, and is also near the Junior High.

=== Old Ayios Dhometios ===
Part of Ayios Dhometios is preserved to its old appearance. It is still an inhabited, and fully functional neighborhood. It has beautiful characteristic Cypriot architecture including the traditional old doors, and colored windows.

== Education ==
Ayios Dhometios has three elementary schools and one junior high school. The 1st elementary, located opposite the Saint Dhometios church, is the oldest and was built during British rule in Cyprus. Prior to the invasion, a fourth elementary school existed and shared building facilities with the junior high school. A new building for the junior high was being built and was ready in June 1974, but the Turkish troops took control of the new building a month later.

== Demographics ==
Agios Dhometios is one of Nicosia's most intensively populated districts with a diverse mixture of cultures. Despite its historic Greek-Cypriot community, Agios Dhometios is home to Nicosia's largest Pontic Greek community which operates a number of shops, restaurants, political clubs and entertainment centers. Agios Dhometios is also largely populated by residents from former Soviet countries with a solid Russian-speaking community, therefore it is easy to see a number of Russian supermarkets such as Nastinka and Mini Mix, kiosks, bakeries. There are over 200 Armenians living in Agios Dhometios, both Cypriot Armenians and Armenian immigrants from the former Soviet Union and Armenia in particular, giving a unique sense to the community through its taverns with Armenian cuisine.

== Sports ==
=== Nicosia Race Club ===
The Nicosia Race Club is the only organization in Cyprus authorized to organize horse races in Cyprus. Races are organized on Sundays and most Wednesdays in winter and spring and on Wednesdays and most Saturdays in the Summer and Fall.

=== Athletes ===
Ayios Dhometios has a long tradition in sporting events. Some of the countries best athletes originate from the towns many sporting clubs. George Anastasiades, current captain of the National Basketball Team; Christos Stylianides, all time legend of Cyprus basketball and Yiannos Ioannou, former captain of the National Football Team all come from Ayios Dhometios.

=== Teams ===
==== ENAD Ayios Dhometios ====
ENAD Ayiou Dometiou (Greek: Ε.Ν.Α.Δ, Ένωσις Νέων Αγίου Δομετίου) was created in 1937 and is one of Nicosia's leading Basketball clubs. They have won two Cyprus championships (1969, 1990) and one Cyprus cup (1987) while the team also used to maintain a football team and a volleyball team. ENAD decided to focus on basketball so they suspended all other activities. During the 2005–06 basketball season, ENAD finished second in the regular season, in their best run in the last ten years, but were eliminated by champions AEL in the semi-finals. Marios Argyrou took over before the 2008–09 season as head coach of the team and returned prior to the 2010–11 season, after winning the title as assistant coach at APOEL. The teams' club house is located on Gregoris Afxentiou Avenue.

==== Mavrommatis Ayios Pavlos ====
Mavrommatis is a handball and table tennis club. Its handball team won promotion to the Cyprus top division after the 2004–05 season in the second division, and avoided relegation in 2005–06.

==== EAS Ayios Dhometios ====
Cyprus' major sport is football and Ayios Dhometios has a team in that sport also. EAS plays in the amateur ranks of the Nicosia league and almost won promotion to the Cyprus fourth division a few seasons back but failed in the play-offs. EAS also maintains an indoor football team that plays in Cyprus' third division but is tipped for promotion in the 2006–07 season. EAS' cycling team is also one of the countries elite.

=== Stadiums ===
Ayios Dhometios has two main stadiums in which the municipality's teams compete. The football stadium is located next to the 1st elementary and seats 1000 fans. It's a gravel pitch and is not in very good condition. The basketball arena or municipal stadium is located in the westernmost part of the town, near the 3rd elementary school. It seats 1500 fans, but the record is 4000 fans during the 1990 basketball finals, where ENAD won the championship. It recently went through a facelift with the addition of a modern wooden parquet floor. It is home court for ENAD basketball, Mavrommatis handball and EAS indoor football teams. The Cyprus Sports Authority has decided to build a new indoor arena in Ayios Dhometios, at the site where the municipal stadium is located. The demolition of the municipal stadium was scheduled in mid-2009 but has been postponed.

=== Olympic torch relay ===
The 2004 Athens Olympics chose Cyprus as one of the torch destinations during its worldwide tour. As a matter of fact, Cyprus was the last stop before the torch returned to Greece and the only country that the torch remained in for more than one day. On July 8, 2004, the torch came to Ayios Dhometios, and a total of 5 runners, carried it through the town.

== Twinned cities ==
Ayios Dhometios is a twinned with:

- Agios Nikolaos, Greece
- Korydallos, Greece
