= Spathari =

Human settlement in Greece

Spathari Σπαθάρι
- Community
- Location within Greece
- Coordinates: 38°45′50″N 23°25′44″E
- Country: Greece
- Administrative region: Central Greece
- Regional unit: Euboea
- Municipality: Mantoudi-Limni-Agia Anna
- Municipal unit: Kireas

Population (2021)
  - Community: 317
- Time zone: UTC+2 (EET)
  - Summer (DST): UTC+3 (EEST)

Spathari (Greek: Σπαθάρι) is a village and a community in the north-center of the island of Euboea in Greece. The community had a population of 317 in 2021. It is part of the municipal unit Kireas.
