= Hellenic Force in Cyprus =

Hellenic Army battalion in Cyprus

- Ελληνική Δύναμη Κύπρου
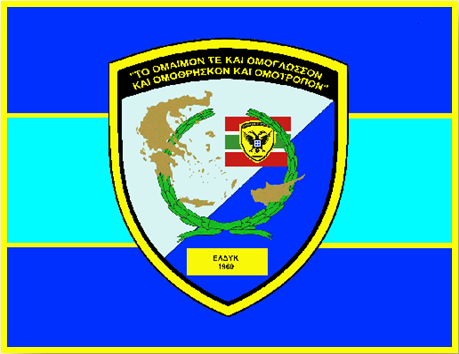
- Active: 1959–present
- Country: Greece
- Allegiance: Cyprus
- Branch: Hellenic Army
- Type: Infantry
- Role: Mechanized infantry
- Size: c. 950 (battalion)
- Part of: Hellenic Armed Forces
- Garrison/HQ: Nicosia, Cyprus ("Camp of Major Sotirios Staurianakos")
- Nickname: Eldykarioi (Greek: Ελδυκάριοι)
- Mottos: Το όμαιμόν τε και ομόγλωσσον και ομόθρησκον και ομότροπον (The same ancestry and common language and common religion and common traditions)
- Uniform camouflage: Greek lizard
- Service rifle: G3
- Engagements: Turkish invasion of Cyprus
- Website: www.army.gr

Commanders
- Current commander: Colonel Ioannis Nasios
- Notable commanders: Dionysios Arbouzis (first); Nikolaos Nikolaidis

Insignia
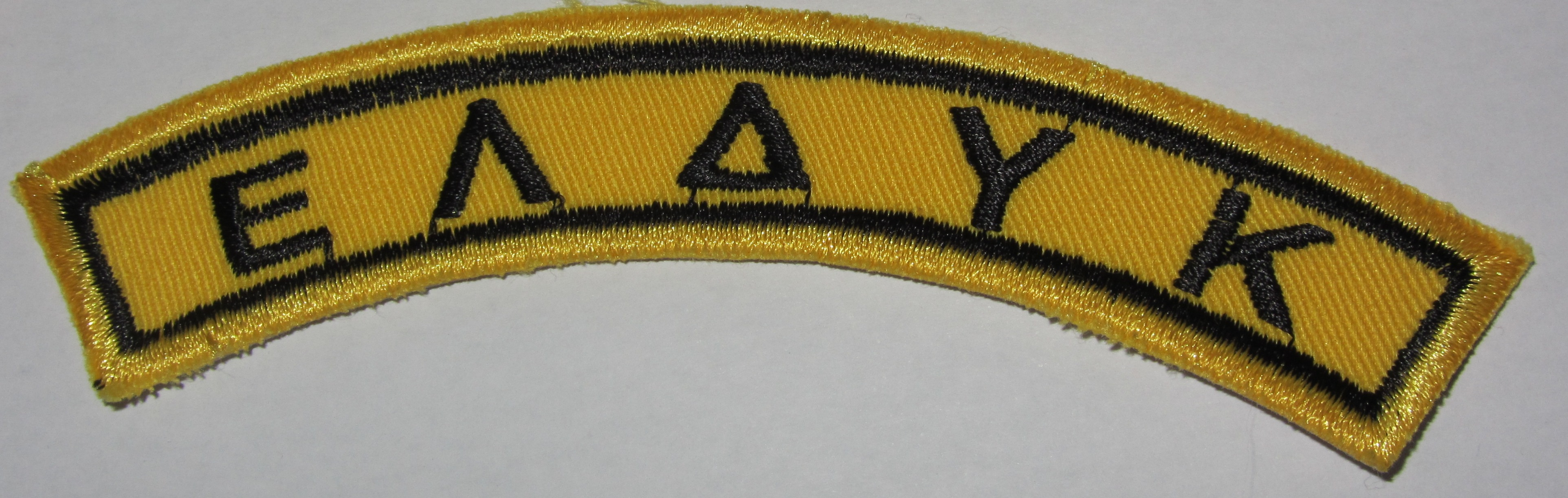
- Patch of the formal uniforms

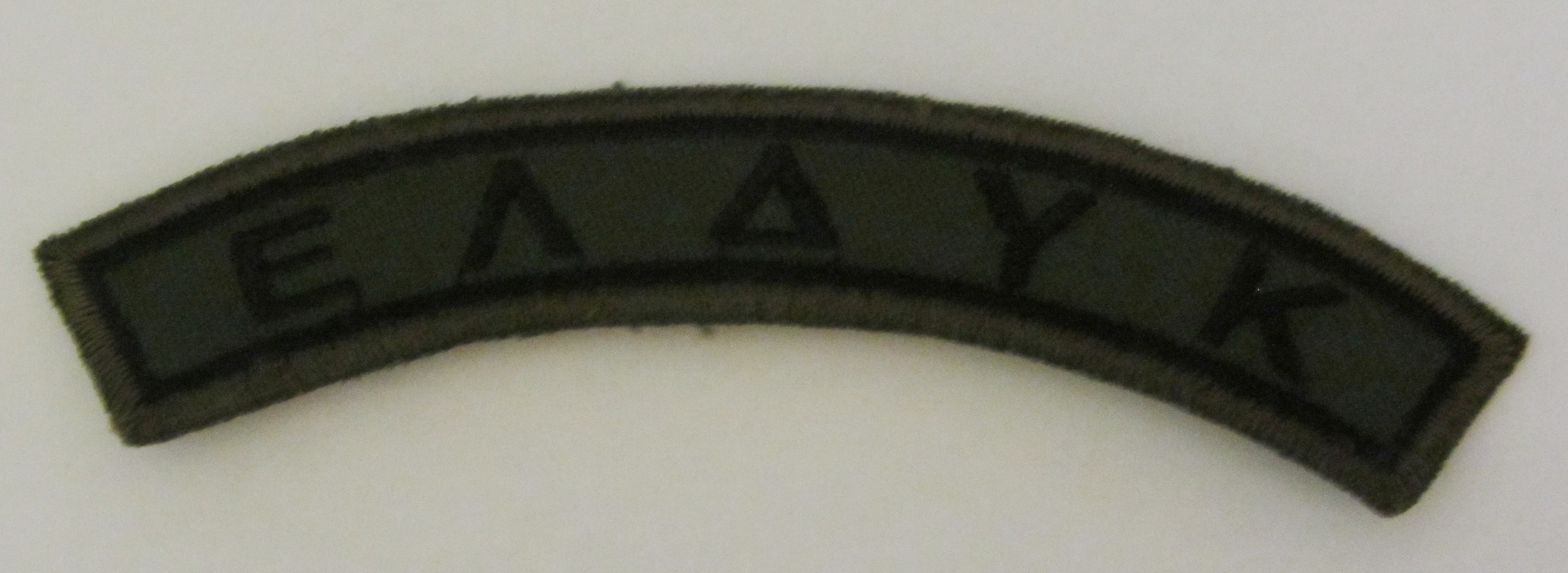
- Patch of the everyday and combat uniforms (low visibility)
- Abbreviation: ΕΛΔΥΚ or ΕΛ.ΔΥ.Κ.

The Hellenic Force in Cyprus (Greek: Ελληνική Δύναμη Κύπρου, romanized: Elliniki Dynami Kyprou, Turkish: Kıbrıs Yunan Alayı), commonly known in its abbreviated form as ELDYK or EL.DY.K. (Greek: ΕΛΔΥΚ or ΕΛ.ΔΥ.Κ., Greek pronunciation: [elðˈik], Turkish: KYA, Turkish pronunciation: [kejea]) is the permanent, battalion-sized Hellenic Army stationed in the Republic of Cyprus. Its role is to help and support the Cypriot National Guard. Soldiers are selected from the ranks of conscripts doing their military service in the Hellenic Army.

== History ==
ELDYK was formed on November 20, 1959 at Agios Stefanos, Athens, soon after the Zürich and London Agreements established the independence of Cyprus. Per the subsequent Treaty of Guarantee, Greece, along with Turkey and the United Kingdom, would be the new state's guarantor powers. To that end, the permanent presence of a small military detachment from both Greece and Turkey was authorized according to the Treaty of Alliance, in addition to the British military presence in the Sovereign Base Areas. It was established as a tripartite headquarters of Greece, Turkey and Cyprus. In this headquarters belonged the Hellenic Force in Cyprus with 950 men and the Turkish Force in Cyprus (Greek: Τουρκική Δύναμη Κύπρου, abbreviated: ΤΟΥΡΔΥΚ or ΤΟΥΡ.ΔΥ.Κ, Greek pronunciation: [turˈðik]) with 650 men, as it was agreed in the Zürich and London Agreement.

=== ELDYK in Cyprus (until 1963) ===
On August 16, 1960, the day that Cyprus became officially independent, ELDYK soldiers and officers disembarked at Famagusta from the Greek Landing Ship Tanks "LIMNOS" (Greek: "ΛΗΜΝΟΣ") and "ALIAKMON" (Greek: "ΑΛΙΑΚΜΩΝ"), the total force was 950 men. The first commander of ELDYK was Colonel Dionysios Arbouzis, a distinguished officer who had already led the Greek Expeditionary Force in Korea. Its camp were established west of Nicosia at the Gerolakkos area, next to the camp of the Turkish Force in Cyprus. The camp was destroyed during the Turkish invasion of Cyprus at 1974.

=== 1963-1973 and Intercommunal violence (1963-1964) ===
In December 1963 serious riots and violence broke out between Greek Cypriots and Turkish Cypriots, the generalization of the conflict and the involvement of the Hellenic Force of Cyprus and Turkish Force of Cyprus was avoided due to the intervention of the United Kingdom.

In January 1964, the Greek Cabinet rejected Turkey's call for an increase in the Greek and Turkish forces in Cyprus, and it decided to take the matter to the North Atlantic Treaty Organization.

In March 1964, Sergeant First Class Sotirios Karagiannis was murdered during a new round of violence. In May 1964 Major Dimitrios Poulios and Captain Vasileios Kapotas were murdered in the Turkish Cypriot district of Famagusta, while Captain Panagiotis Tarsoulis was injured. Their driver, police officer Konstantinos Pantelidis was murdered too. In the same period, members of ELDYK were involved in violent incidents against the Turkish Armed Forces and militias.

=== Turkish invasion of Cyprus (1974) ===
During the Turkish invasion of Cyprus, between 20 July and 16 August 1974, ELDYK fought against the Turkish forces in several battles. The commander of ELDYK, at that time, was Colonel Nikolaos Nikolaidis. Second in command were Lieutenant Colonel Konstantinos Papagiannis, during the first phase of invasion (20–23 July 1974) and until 9 August, and Colonel Panagiotis Stavroulopoulos, from 10 August and during all the second phase of the invasion (14–16 August 1974). Panagiotis Stavroulopoulos was deputy commander of the ELDYK till September of the same year. During the invasion, ELDYK's units were dispatches to various places in Cyprus in order to help the Cypriot National Guard. Along with ELDYK, Greece managed to involve an airborne battalion in fighting, raising the total number of Greek troops. The Cypriot National Guard managed to mobilise only a fraction of its 10,000 force, while the total number of the Turkish invading force, was around 40,000.

The classes of ELDYK that fought in 1974 were the 103rd, 105th and 107th.

Class 103 consisted of soldiers who were being discharged and were due to return to Greece on board the Greek Landing Ship Tank (ex-USS LST-389) "Lesvos" (Greek: "Λέσβος"). They departed Cyprus on 19 July 1974, after the arrival of their replacement class 107. When the invasion started on the 20th of July 1974, the Hellenic Navy ordered the commander of Lesvos (by then sailing off Rhodes), Lt Cdr Eleftherios Handrinos, to change course and return to Cyprus in order to disembark its troops. That same afternoon, the ship arrived at Paphos and class 103 disembarked. Soldiers from class 103 manned the ship's guns and for over two hours shelled the Turkish Cypriot forces in the area. The Turkish Cypriots surrendered to the Cypriot National Guard and their weapons and equipment were captured. Soon after, the men of class 103 moved during the night towards the Nicosia International Airport and in the morning, they arrived at the airport and from there they eventually reached the camp of ELDYK.

Class 107 was composed of new recruits who had come to replace class 103 arriving at Cyprus on the "Lesvos" at 19 July 1974, one day before the invasion. UNFICYP monitored the rotation of ELDYK's classes and they kept their HQ informed concerning the progress of the operation. After the Lesvos disembarkation, UNFICYP confirmed that she had brought 410 men and 11 vehicles from class 107, and taken out 422 men and 10 vehicles from class 103.

==== Battles ====
The most notable battles involving ELDYK forces at 1974, were:

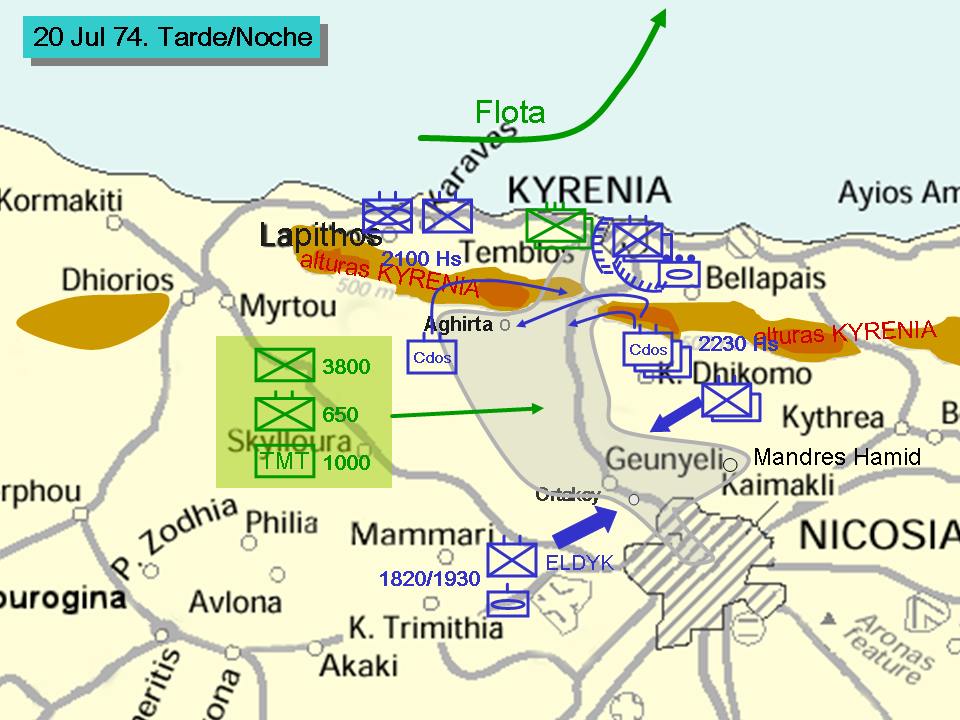
Location of Turkish forces during the late hours of 20 July 1974. ELDYK contingents in blue.

- The battle of Paphos (20 July 1974)
- Attacks against the area of Kioneli (20–21 July 1974)
- The battle of the ELDYK camp (22–23 July 1974)
- The Battle of Nicosia Airport (23 July 1974)
- The battle of Lapithos (6 August 1974)
- The battle of Karavas (6 August 1974)
- The battle of Vasilia Passage (7 August 1974)
- The battle of the English College (14 August 1974)
- The second battle of the ELDYK camp (14–16 August 1974)

More than 150 men either died or are missing as a result of the invasion, some of these men are buried in the Tomb of Makedonitissa.

==== Equipment ====
The equipment of ELDYK's men at that time were:

- M1 carbine (Service rifle)
- FN FAL (Soldiers of the class 103 equipped with these weapons)
- Captured G3 rifles from the invading Turkish troops.
- Bayonet
- M1 helmet

== The Tomb of Makedonitissa ==
The Tomb of Makedonitissa (Greek: Τύμβος της Μακεδονίτισσας), is a military cemetery and war memorial, west of Nicosia, at Engomi in the area of Makedonitissa (35°09′15″N 33°18′29″E). This was the place where one Greek Nord Noratlas was shot down by friendly fire on 22 July 1974, during the Operation Niki (Greek: Επιχείρηση "ΝΙΚΗ"). "Niki" was a military operation of the Greek Army to send some elements of the Greek special forces by air to help the Cypriot National Guard.

Greek Cypriot officers and soldiers who were killed during the 1974 Turkish invasion of Cyprus are buried in this tomb.

== ELDYK today ==
ELDYK is still in Cyprus and its headquarters is near Nicosia; its previous camp was destroyed in 1974 and the surrounding area (Gerolakkos or Yerolakkos area) is now under Turkish control. Its role is to support the Cypriot National Guard; for this reason, ELDYK regularly holds joint military exercises in cooperation with the Cypriot National Guard.

=== Emblem ===
The ELDYK emblem shows the silhouettes of Greece and Cyprus crowned with a common laurel wreath. Between the two countries is the emblem of the Greek Army. Under the wreath is written "ΕΛΔΥΚ 1960", which is the abbreviation of the force in Greek ("ΕΛΔΥΚ") and the year it disembarked at Cyprus ("1960"). At the top is written the motto of ELDYK: "Το όμαιμόν τε και ομόγλωσσον και ομόθρησκον και ομότροπον". The two blue tints on the emblem represents the blue of the sky and the blue of the sea, symbolizing the same sea and sky surrounds these two countries.

=== Motto ===
The motto of ELDYK is "Το όμαιμόν τε και ομόγλωσσον και ομόθρησκον και ομότροπον", which means: "The same ancestry and common language and common religion and common traditions".

This is an alteration of the work of the ancient Greek historian Herodotus, who had written in the eighth book of Histories, entitled Urania, at 144: "...αύτις το ελληνικόν εόν όμαιμόν τε και ομόγλωσσον και θεών ιδρύματα κοινά και θυσίαι ήθεά τε ομότροπα...", which means: "...the Greek nation is from the same ancestry and have common language and common sanctuaries and common sacrifices and common traditions...". The meaning is that Greeks share the same national identity and consciousness, regardless of borders.

=== Personnel ===
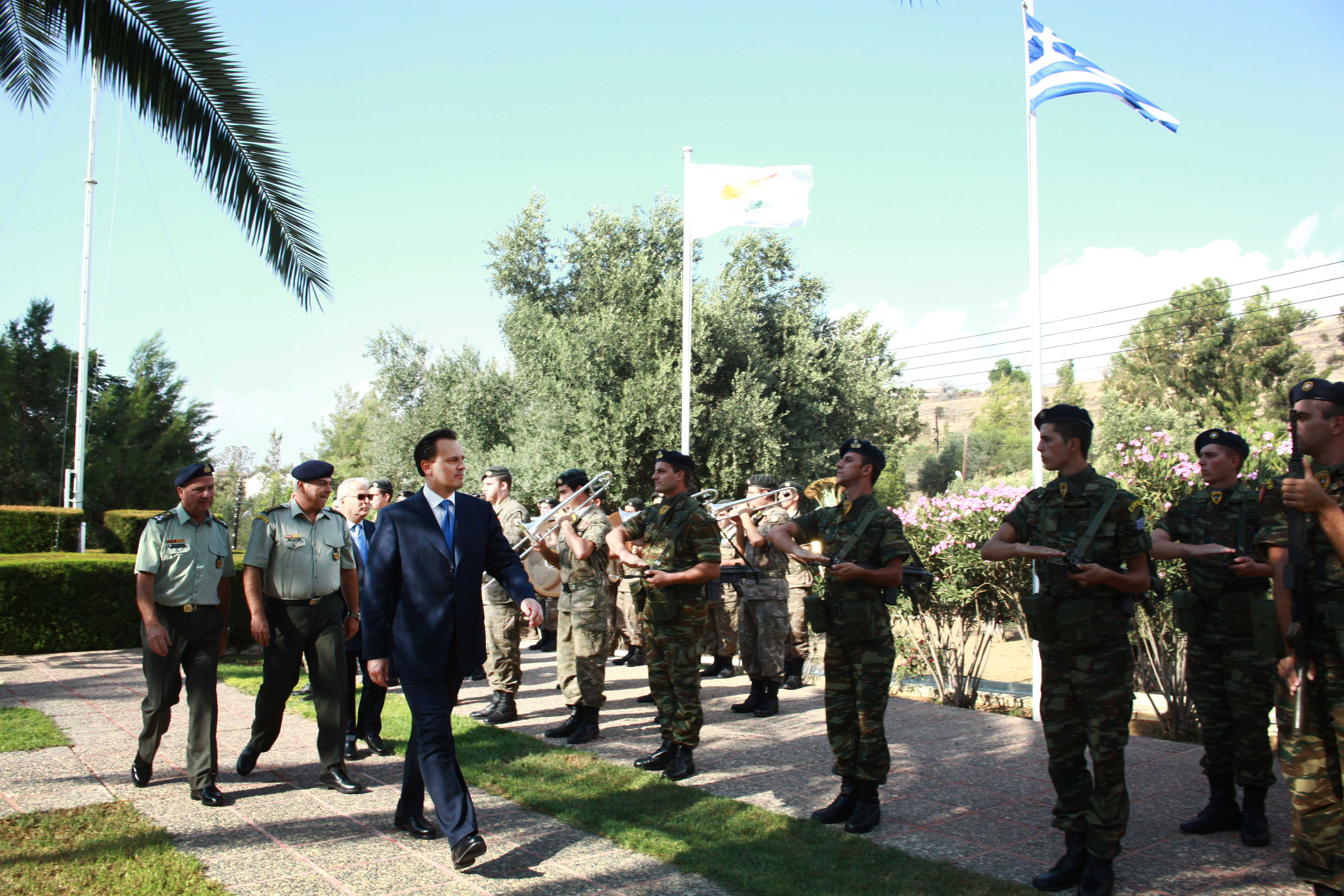
Former Minister of Foreign Affairs of Greece Dimitrios Droutsas, visiting the camp of ELDYK in 2010.

Soldiers and officers of the Hellenic Force in Cyprus (ELDYK) are all Greek citizens. Soldiers are selected among the ranks of conscripts who do their military service. Although some men volunteer for the unit, the core of the force is selected directly by the Greek Army General Staff on the basis of physical ability and skills.

After the completion of their basic training in Greece they are dispatched to Cyprus on planes, separated into two detachments totalling approximately 300 men: one detachment departs from Sparta and the other from the armored training camp of Avlon. Although not as demanding as the training received in units of the Special Forces, the training of ELDYK is considerably harder than the training received by ordinary infantrymen serving in Greece, making it one of the most battle ready units of the Greek Armed Forces. In compensation for serving abroad, the men of ELDYK are salaried and have access to better facilities.

Men who are selected for ELDYK are nicknamed Eldykarioi (Greek: Ελδυκάριοι), singular: Eldykarios (Greek: Ελδυκάριος). This nickname stays with them long after they return to Greece. When their service at Cyprus is completed and they are about to return to Greece to continue their service there, the army awards them with special honors for their service at Cyprus.

=== Military ranks scale and ranks insignia ===
ELDYK follows the Greek's army ranks scale and insignia (Officers ranks and ranks insignia, Non-commissioned officers and soldiers ranks and ranks insignia), which has the NATO standard ranks scale.

=== Uniforms ===
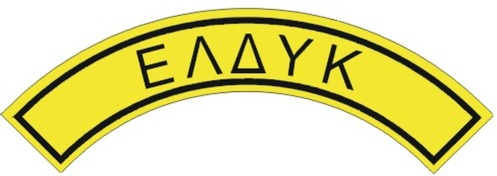
Patch of the formal uniforms

There are 2 types of military uniforms, one formal for parades, celebrations, and other special occasions (like the Army Service Uniform-ASU), and the everyday combat uniform (like the Army Combat Uniform-ACU). The uniforms are the same as in the Greek army, with the difference of embroidered patches on both shoulders (shoulder sleeve insignia), which have black letters that form the word: "ΕΛΔΥΚ" (ΕΛΔΥΚ is the abbreviation of the force in Greek).

The patches are dark green (low visibility patches) in the combat military uniforms, and yellow in the formal uniforms. Unofficially, these patches are called: eldykosima (Greek: ελδυκόσημα), singular: eldykosimo (Greek: ελδυκόσημο), which means: "the badge of ELDYK". The uniform camouflage pattern is the Greek Lizard.

=== Equipment ===
Personnel of ELDYK are using Greek's army equipment. The service rifles of ELDYK soldiers are some variants of G3.

=== Headquarters camp ===
The headquarters camp is near Nicosia. Its name is "Camp of Major Sotirios Staurianakos". The camp is named in honor of the Captain Sotirios Staurianakos, who was killed at 16 August 1974 during the last day of the battle of the ELDYK camp. He was posthumously promoted to Major after his death. In the camp, there is a memorial representing a soldier who gestures with his hand towards the area of the previous camp of ELDYK (destroyed during the Turkish invasion at 1974) and has inscribed on a marble slab the names and the ranks of the officers and soldiers of the force who were killed or are missing.

=== Museum ===
The museum of ELDYK is at its headquarters camp. Because the museum is located in a military area under the control of the army, permission from the army must be granted in order to visit.

=== Parallel Formations ===
Separately from ELDYK, Greek special forces from the 35th Raider Squadron are also stationed on Cyprus, and cooperate with the Cypriot National Guard and ELDYK. These forces are distinct from ELDYK and fall under the authority of the 1st Raider–Paratrooper Brigade.

== In popular culture ==
In Limassol, a road is named "Machiton ELDYK" (Greek: Μαχητών ΕΛΔΥΚ) (34°42′28″N 33°3′16″E), which means "Fighters of ELDYK".

== Monuments and memorials ==
=== Cyprus ===
Name of the Memorial/ Monument	Area	Coordinates
ELDYK's HQ camp Memorial	Nicosia	35°01′53″N 33°10′58″E (military area)
The Tomb of Makedonitissa	Nicosia	35°09′15″N 33°18′29″E
ELDYK Memorial Park	Larnaka	34°53′38″N 33°37′57″E

=== Greece ===
( * ) The word "Cyprus" is engraved on the tomb in order to honor the men who were killed in Cyprus.

Name of the Memorial/ Monument	Area	Coordinates
The Tomb of the Unknown Soldier *	Syntagma Square in Athens	37°58′31″N 23°44′10″E
Memorial for the men killed in Cyprus	Athens	37.979180°N 23.716647°E
ELDYK Memorial	Peristeri	38.013054°N 23.682172°E
ELDYK Memorial	Lamia	38.89378°N 22.44571°E
ELDYK Memorial	Spathari Village	38°45′40.68″N 23°25′12.07″E

== Gallery ==
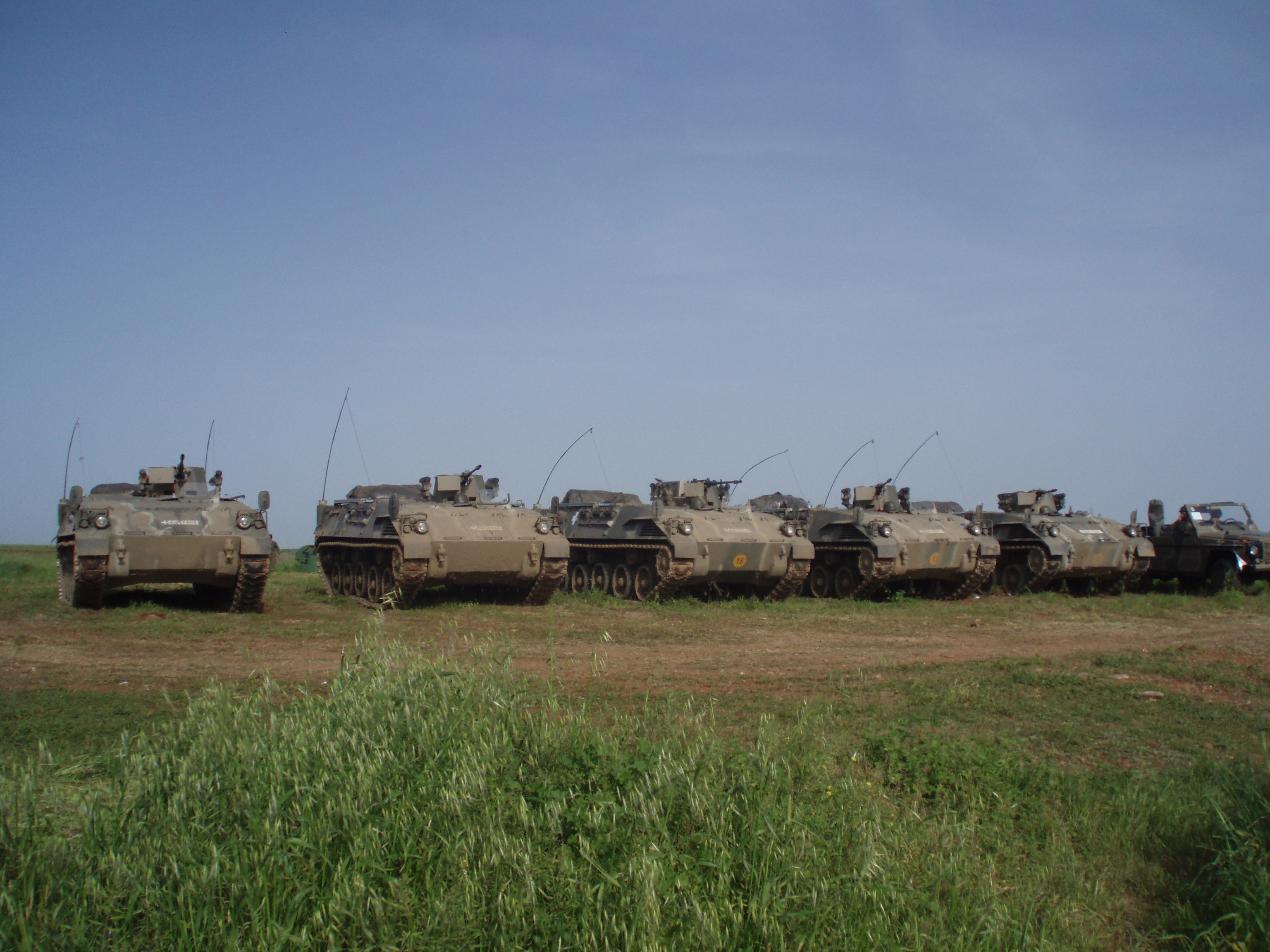
Armored Personnel Carriers (ELBO Leonidas-2) and a Mercedes-Benz G-Class vehicle of the Hellenic Force in Cyprus.

== See also ==
- Cypriot National Guard
- Hellenic Army
- Turkish Armed Forces in Northern Cyprus
- Turkish Cypriot Security Force
- Turkish invasion of Cyprus
