= Operation Niki =

Greek airlift during the Turkish invasion of Cyprus in 1974

- Part of Turkish invasion of Cyprus
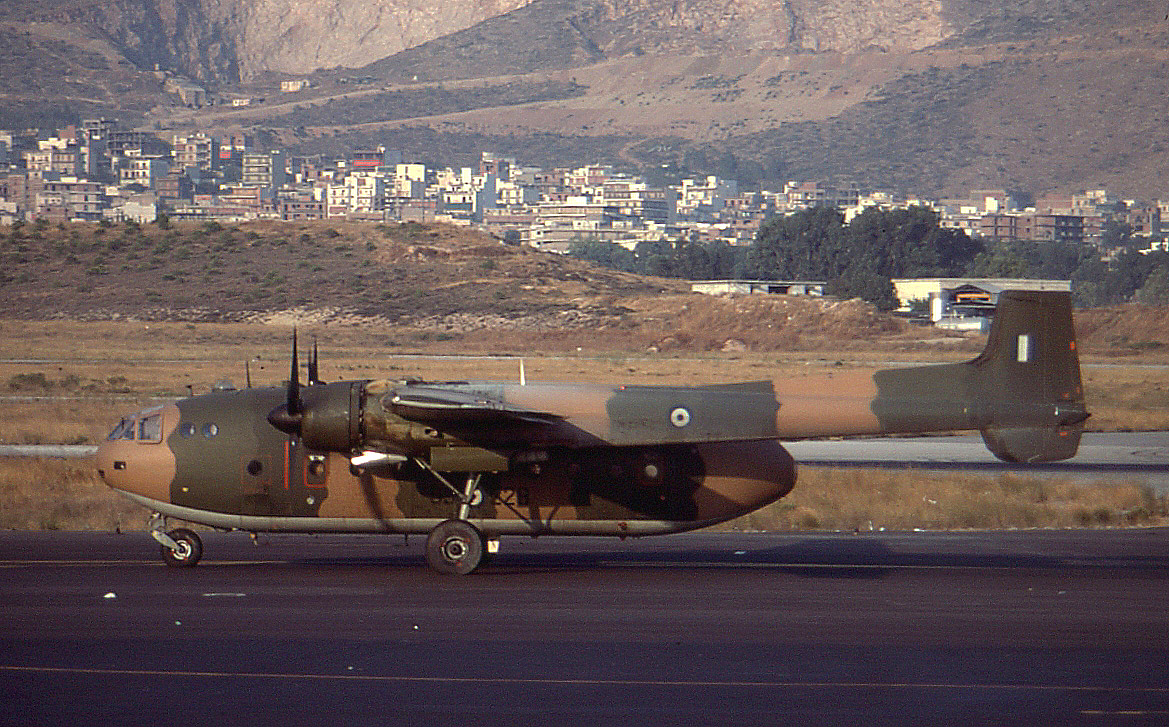
- A Hellenic Air Force Noratlas on a training mission in Ellinikon International Airport, Athens, 1979
- Type: Clandestine airlift
- Location: Nicosia airport, Cyprus
- Planned by: Greece
- Objective: Reinforcement of Cypriot forces
- Date: 21–22 July 1974
- Executed by: (Greece) Hellenic Air Force: 354th Sqdn. "Pegasus"; 115 Combat Wing; (20 Noratlas and 10 C-47 aircraft); (Cyprus) Cypriot National Guard: Cypriot anti-aircraft 195 MEA/AP battalion
- Outcome: Reinforced Cypriot forces with significant losses
- Casualties: Aircraft crew and 33 commandos killed in action 10 commandos wounded in action Destruction of three aircraft.

Operation Niki (Greek: Επιχείρηση Νίκη), named after the goddess Nike, was a clandestine airlift operation during the Turkish invasion of Cyprus that was carried out on 21–22 July 1974, with the aim of transporting a battalion of Greek commandos from Souda, Crete to Nicosia, Cyprus. Upon their arrival, the aircraft were engaged in friendly fire, which resulted in the loss of 33 men and the destruction of three aircraft.

== Background ==
Since the 1950s, Greece had established a foreign policy favoring the union of Cyprus with Greece. In 1960, the Republic of Cyprus was established with Greek Cypriots and Turkish Cypriots being its two founding communities. Archbishop Makarios was elected as its first President. Makarios came to believe that unification of the island with Greece was not possible and pursued a policy of non-alignment.

After a military coup in April 1967, a right-wing military junta seized power in Athens. The Greek juntists suspected Makarios for not being truly in favor of unification and prepared five plans to overthrow him between 1971 and 1974. Eventually, on 15 July 1974, a military coup d'état orchestrated by the Cypriot National Guard and the junta of Athens succeeded in deposing Makarios and replacing him with nationalist Nikos Sampson. On the pretext of a peacekeeping operation, Turkey took military action code-named Operation Atilla and invaded Cyprus on 20 July 1974.

== Preparations and departure ==
The Greek leadership in Athens was largely taken by surprise. The political situation deteriorated rapidly due to the Turkish invasion and the junta was soon at the verge of total collapse. Despite an initial order for implementation, the existing military plans for the reinforcement of the defenses in Cyprus were cancelled. In a climate of confusion and indecision, it was eventually decided to send one commando battalion by air. An initial plan to airlift a battalion based in northern Greece from Thessaloniki airport using requisitioned Boeing 720 aircraft of Olympic Airways was cancelled. Later, it was decided to airlift another unit from Souda airport, using almost the entire transport fleet of the Hellenic Air Force at the time. The unit chosen was the A' Raider Squadron, reinforced with men from the amphibious-capable C' Raider Squadron. Thus, in the late afternoon of July 21, a fleet of 20 Noratlas and 10 C-47 aircraft were relocated to Souda airport, base of the 115th Combat Wing.

According to orders, the transport aircraft would secretly take off at night with five minutes separation and fly without fighter escort. To avoid detection, they would fly at altitudes below 200 ft in full radio silence with minimum lights and no visual contact between them. They would land in Nicosia, unload the force and take off immediately for the return to Greece under the cover of darkness. Each aircraft would carry four airmen (two pilots, a flight engineer and a navigator) and approximately 30 commandos with their weapons and ammunition. It was estimated that the 750 km flight to Cyprus would last around three hours. As a result, the latest time at which an aircraft could take off, fly to Cyprus, unload and depart before dawn was 24:00. The first plane departed Souda at around 22:35 and the departure plan was followed by the first five aircraft. Afterwards, several delays resulted in only 13 Noratlas aircraft of the 354th Tactical Transport Squadron managing to take off before the midnight time limit and 2 after the midnight limit against orders but not all managing to land due to time constraints. These planes were numbered in the order of their departure, receiving codes Niki-1 to Niki-15. The remaining five Noratlases and all the C-47 did not take off.

== Arrival in Nicosia ==
External image
- Flight path followed by the Noratlases from Souda to Nicosia.

The Cypriot National Guard lacked an air force, hence Turkey had full air superiority over the island. Turkish Air Force had bombed Nicosia airport and only one third of the runway was usable.

Of the 15 Noratlases that took off, 13 made it to Cyprus and the remaining two landed on Crete and Rhodes due to mechanical problems. Upon arrival at Nicosia International Airport at around 02:00 AM, the aircraft were engaged by Cypriot National Guard anti-aircraft gunners of the 195 MEA/AP battalion, who were uninformed about their arrival and mistook them for a Turkish airborne assault. As a result, the 4th Noratlas (Niki-4) received heavy fire and was shot down two miles short of the runway with the loss of four crew and 27 commandos. Two more commandos were killed and 10 wounded on-board Niki-6, which landed with both engines severely damaged. One more Noratlas aircraft (Niki-3) was badly damaged and could not take off again. Another aircraft (Niki-12) did not have sufficient fuel for the return flight. These aircraft were destroyed on the ground by the co-pilot and the engineer of Niki 12, following orders of the Hellenic Air Force Headquarters. The rationale for doing so was that Greece was not officially at war with Turkey, thus any evidence of Greek involvement in the operations in Cyprus should be erased. The remaining nine aircraft managed to return safely to Greece after unloading their troops.

== Aftermath ==
The transported Greek commando unit, which was given the Greek Cypriot designation 35th Raider Squadron (35 MK), fought during the Battle of Nicosia Airport being crucial in its defense and successfully defended the airport. They also fought during the second Turkish invasion of August 1974 and contributed decisively to preventing Nicosia from falling into Turkish hands. Ironically, the unit had no casualties in the battlefield. With the exception of the order to Lt Cdr E. Handrinos to turn back his vessel (L-172 Lesvos) and disembark the ELDYK troops he had picked up the previous day, Operation Niki marked the only materialized Greek attempt to reinforce the defense of Cyprus during the invasion.

No military investigation was ever ordered regarding the circumstances of the loss of Niki-4 and neither was anyone ever held responsible. The Greek junta collapsed on 23 July 1974, mainly because of the events in Cyprus.

== Return of remains ==
The remains of Niki-4 and the bodies of most of the men it carried were hastily buried on a hill, which is now a military cemetery and war memorial known as Makedonitissa Tomb. In summer 2015, excavations started at Makedonitissa with the aim to recover any human remains. After 14 months, DNA identification of those on board was completed and the remains of 16 Greek soldiers were handed over to their relatives in early October, 2016, 42 years after their death.

== Criticism of the operation ==
Operation Niki has been characterized as suicidal. It was ill-prepared and used unreliable, ageing aircraft and aircraft crews and commandos were unfamiliar with the terrain at their destination. Ground forces at Nicosia had not been notified in time about their arrival. The operation had no tactical justification but merely a symbolic and morale-boosting character. The rationale of an airlift instead of an airdrop operation has also been criticized.

== See also ==
- Military operations during the Turkish invasion of Cyprus
- Cyprus dispute
- Manolis Bikakis
