= Ledra Palace Hotel =

Hotel in Nicosia, Cyprus

Coordinates: 35.1779°N 33.3547°E

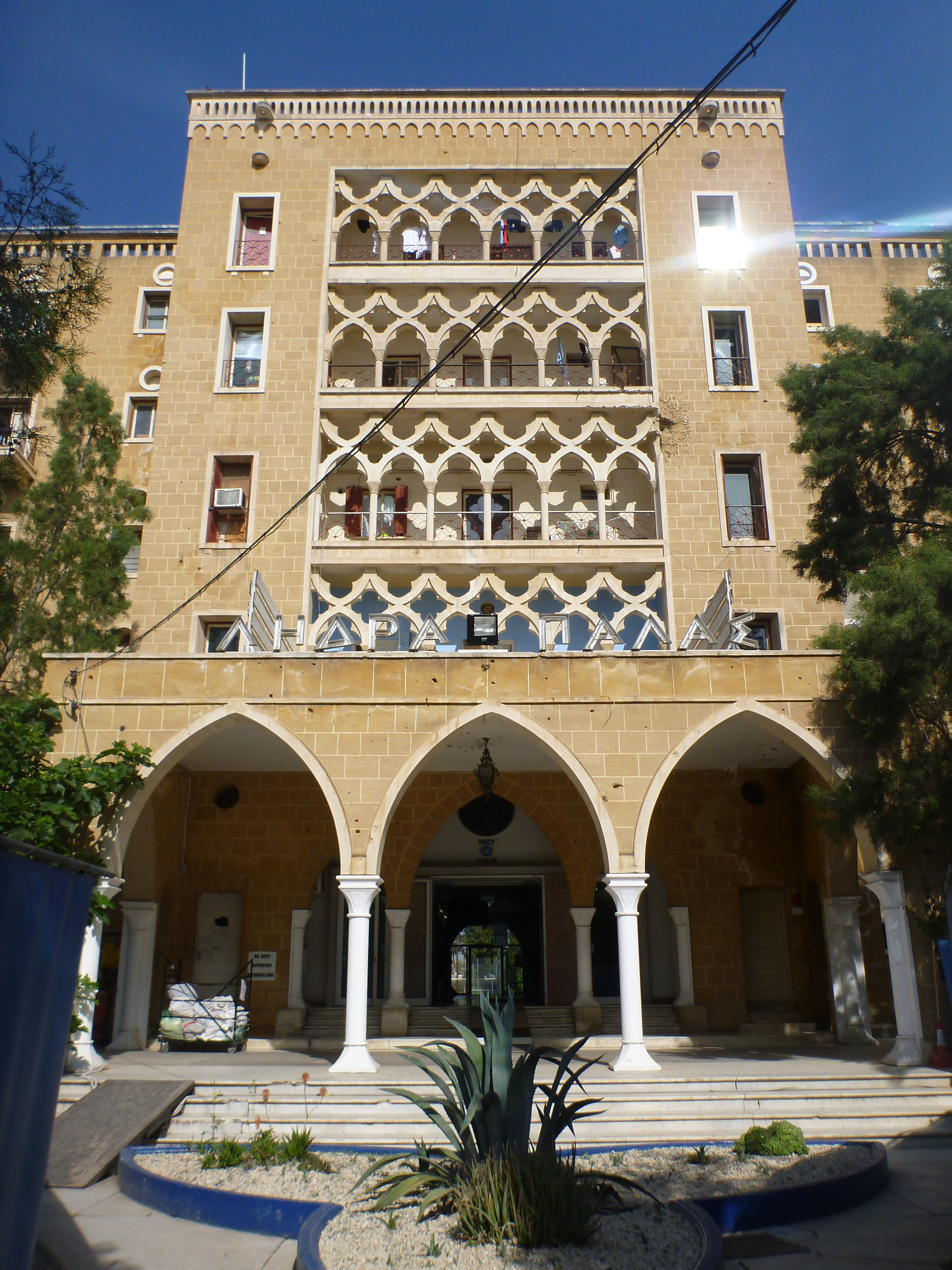
- The Eastern façade of the hotel in 2012.
- Interactive map of the Ledra Palace Hotel area

General information
- Location: Nicosia, Cyprus, Markos Drakos Avenue, Nicosia
- Opening: 1949

Design and construction
- Architect: Benjamin Günsberg

Other information
- Number of rooms: 200
- Number of restaurants: 2
- Number of bars: 2

The Ledra Palace Hotel is located in central Nicosia, Cyprus, and until 1974 was one of the largest and most glamorous hotels of the capital. The hotel was designed by the German Jewish architect Benjamin Günsberg and was built between 1947 and 1949 by Cyprus Hotels Limited at a cost of approx £240,000 Cyprus pounds on what was then called King Edward VII Street, since 1962 Markos Drakos Avenue. The hotel opened on 8 October 1949 in the presence of British Governor Sir Andrew Wright and Vice Mayor of Nicosia George Poulios. It originally had 94 bedrooms and 150 beds, officially rated as de luxe. All rooms had hot and cold water, central heating and a telephone. Facilities included a conference room, reading room, bridge room, and ballroom with orchestra. There were two restaurants, two bars and a café. Located within the garden was a swimming pool (which was installed in 1964), paddling pool, children's playground and tennis courts. The hotel had two additional floors added in 1967–1968, thus raising its capacity to 200 rooms and 320 beds.

During the invasion, the Turkish military attempted to take the hotel however were unsuccessful. Following the announcement of the truce it fell within the boundaries of the UN Buffer Zone and from 1974 to 2019 served as the headquarters for Sector 2 United Nations Roulement Regiment (URR) part of UNFICYP. A 2017 Strategic Review Team from United Nations Headquarters found that due to outdated health and safety measures, the upper floors of the building would have to be vacated by UN forces. A new location opposite of the hotel, named Wolseley Barracks, was chosen as the new headquarters for Sector 2. It has a capacity for 151 troops and 24 officers and opened in 2019.

The Ledra Palace Hotel has played host to many high level meetings between Greek Cypriot and Turkish Cypriot leaders, as well as hundreds of structured conflict resolution workshops between Greek Cypriot and Turkish Cypriot peace builders supported and facilitated both by international organizations (e.g., Fulbright, Institute of Multi-track Diplomacy, United States Agency for International Development) and local pioneers (e.g., Cyprus Conflict Resolution Trainers Group). It is also used as the venue for cultural events aiming at bringing the two communities closer together as well as for meetings of general interest.

Since 2004 it has been the site of a designated crossing point of the Green Line separating the Republic of Cyprus controlled areas from the de facto Turkish Republic of Northern Cyprus.
