= Makedonitissa Tomb =

Military cemetery and war memorial in Cyprus

Coordinates: 35°09′15″N 33°18′29″E

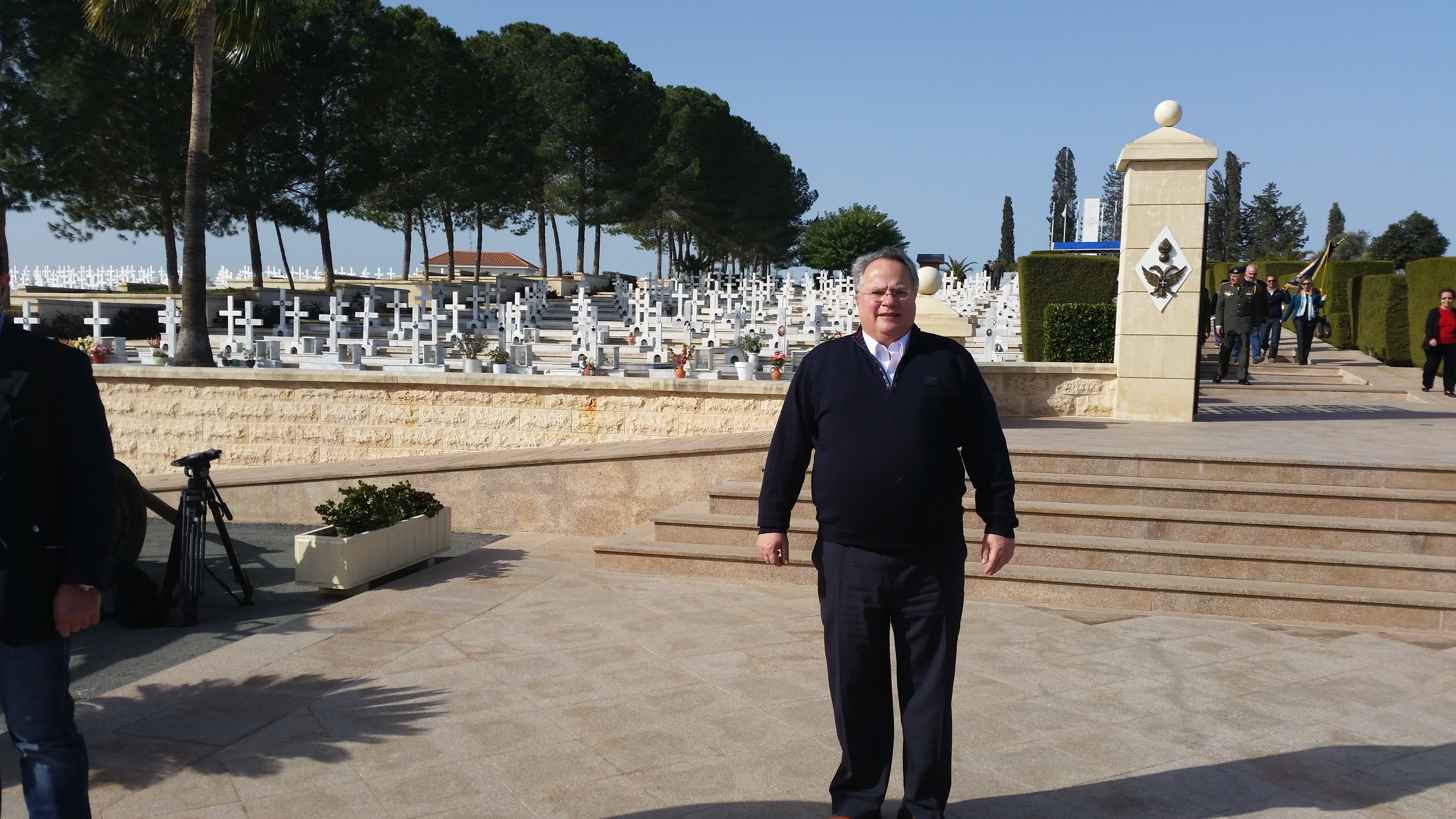
Former Greek Foreign Minister Nikos Kotzias at the Tomb of Makedonitissa, February 3, 2015

The Makedonitissa Tomb (Greek: Τύμβος της Μακεδονίτισσας) is a military cemetery and war memorial west of Nicosia, at Engomi in the area of Makedonitissa.

This is the location where one Greek Nord Noratlas was shot down by friendly fire on 22 July 1974, during Operation "Niki". "Niki" was a military operation of the Greek Armed Forces to airlift a battalion of Greek commandos to Cyprus in order to reinforce the Cypriot National Guard against Turkish invasion forces.

This tomb is the resting place of Greek Cypriot and some Greek officers and soldiers who were killed during the Turkish invasion.
