= Nicosia International Airport =

Closed airport in Cyprus

Nicosia International Airport Διεθνές Αεροδρόμιο Λευκωσίας Lefkoşa Uluslararası Havaalanı
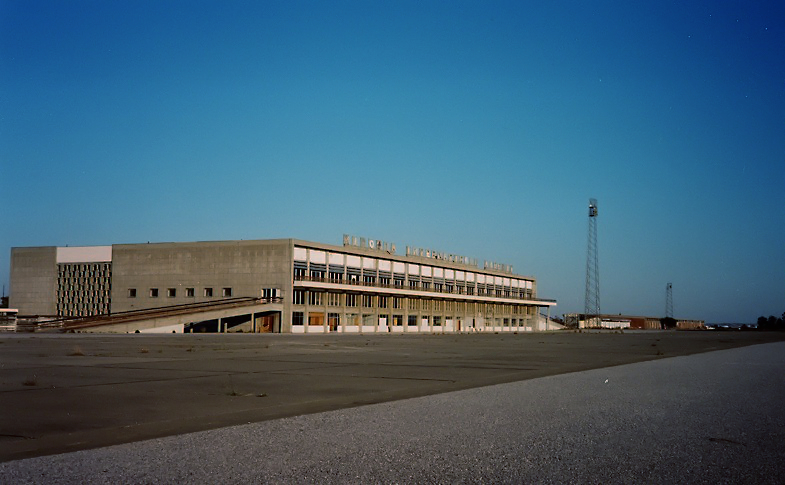
- The now-derelict passenger terminal at Nicosia International Airport
- IATA: NIC; ICAO: LCNC

Summary
- Airport type: Military (and formerly: joint Civil)
- Owner: Cyprus
- Operator: UN UNFICYP
- Serves: Nicosia
- Location: Lakatamia, Nicosia
- Opened: 1939
- Closed: 1974 (last flight from 1977)
- Elevation AMSL: 722 ft (220 m)
- Coordinates: 35°09′00″N 033°16′38″E

Map
- Location in Cyprus

Runways
Direction	Length		Surface
Direction	ft	m	Surface
14/32	8,882	2,707	asphalt
09/27	5,988	1,825	asphalt

Nicosia International Airport (Greek: Διεθνές Αεροδρόμιο Λευκωσίας, Turkish: Lefkoşa Uluslararası Havalimanı) is a largely disused airport located 8.2 km (5.1 mi) west of the Cypriot capital city of Nicosia in the Lakatamia suburb. It was originally the main airport for the island, but nearly all commercial activity ceased following the Turkish invasion of Cyprus in 1974. The last commercial flight flew out of the airport in 1977. The airport site is now mainly used as the headquarters of the United Nations Peacekeeping Force in Cyprus.

== History ==
Interior of the derelict terminal building

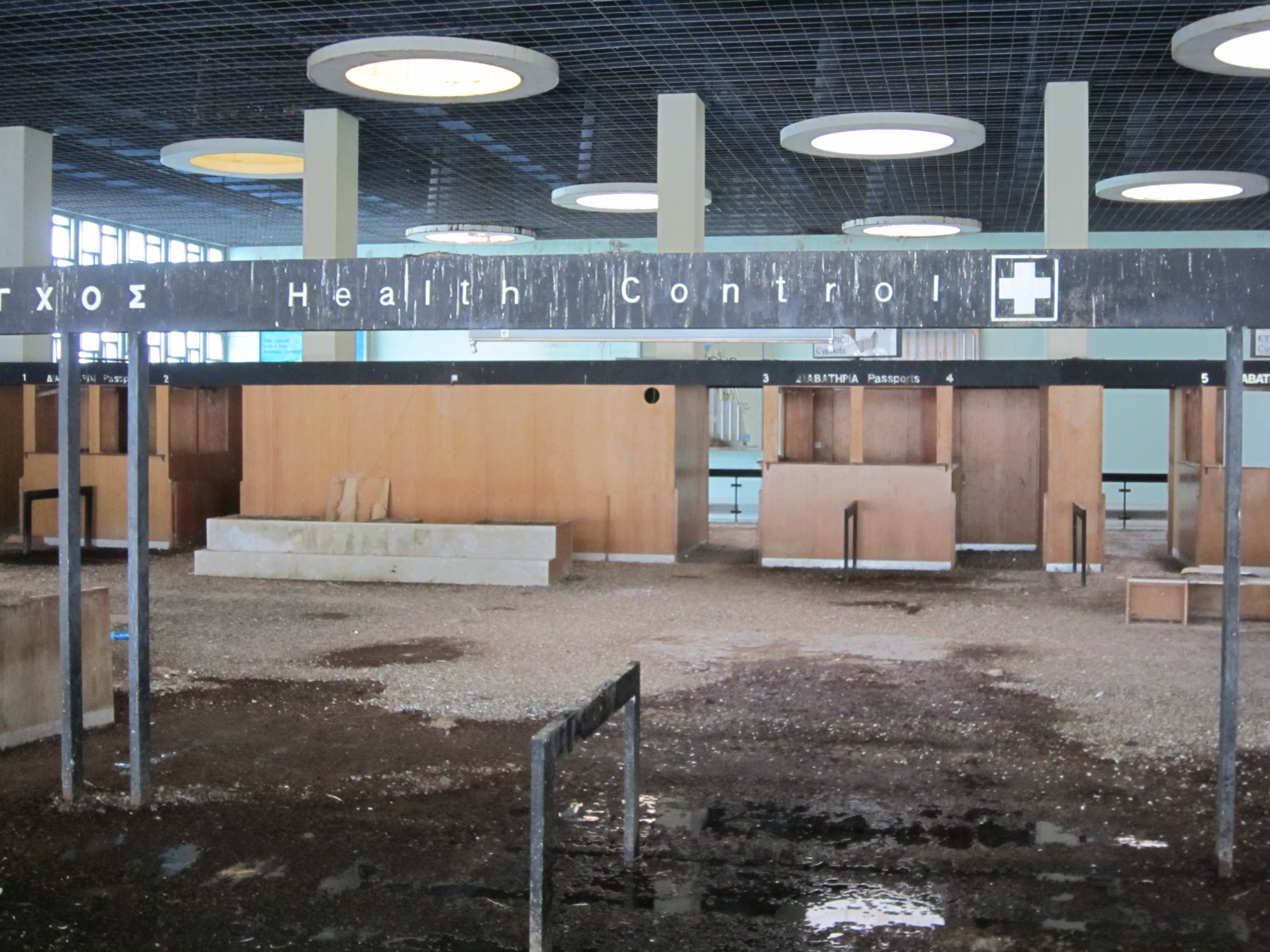
Health control area within the derelict terminal building

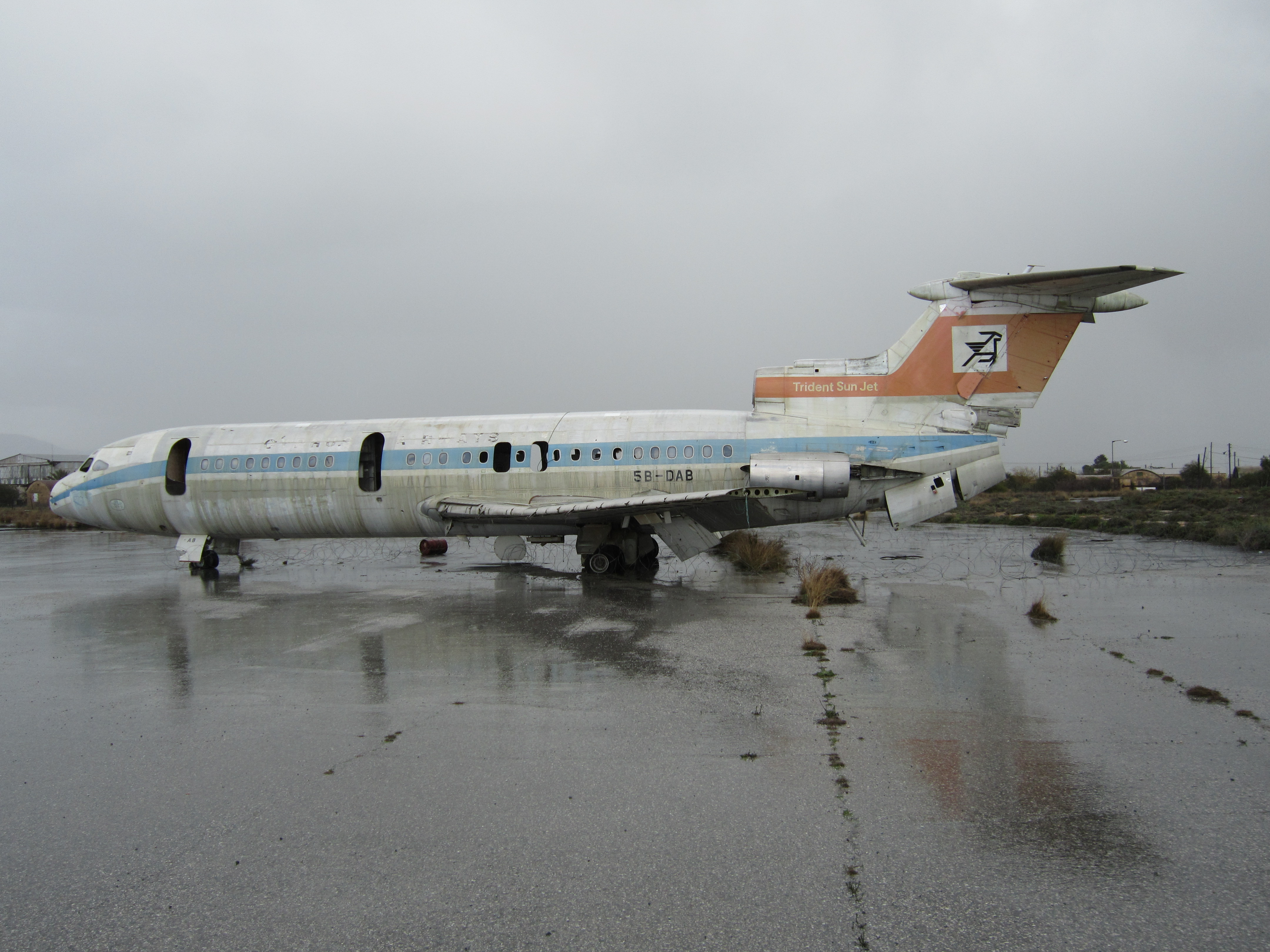
The mouflon logo of the original Cyprus Airways, on a derelict Hawker Siddeley Trident 2E; too damaged by Turkish troops on 22 July 1974, it was unable to fly out with the other three remaining aircraft recovered in 1977.

Nicosia International Airport was the principal airport for Cyprus from its initial construction in the 1930s as the Royal Air Force station RAF Nicosia until 1974. The landing strip was constructed in 1939 by the Shell Company and Pierides & Michaelides Ltd. Services were provided by Misrair with four-engined DH.86 aircraft.

During the Second World War, the airport's facilities and runway were extended by local contractors Stelios Joannou and George Paraskevaides. American bombers used the runway in 1943/1944 when returning from Allied bombings of the Romanian Ploieşti oil fields.

Following World War II, commercial services were reintroduced, and by 1948 Misrair, BOAC, Cyprus Airways and MEA were providing regular services.

The facilities provided were limited, with three Nissen huts used as a terminal building housing Customs, Immigration, Civil Aviation, Signals, Traffic and Operational Services. Restaurant services were provided by the NAAFI.

In 1949 the first terminal building was designed and built by the Public Works Department at a cost of £50,000 (£1,527,630 in 2015) and was opened in May of that year. The building was then extended together with the aircraft apron in 1959. The building was vacated in 1968 with the opening of the new terminal. The Nicosia Flying Club and other flying organisations continued to use the old building.

The RAF withdrew from the airfield in 1966 due to limited space brought on by vastly increasing civilian aircraft movements. On 27 March 1968 a modern new terminal, designed by a West German company Dorsch und Gehrmann from Wiesbaden, and built by Cybarco, was opened at a cost of £1,100,000, of which £500,000 was contributed by Britain. The new terminal could accommodate 800 passengers at one time and the parking apron could handle eleven aircraft.

In June 1974, plans were in place for the terminal to be extended and the apron to be enlarged to 16 aircraft, of which two places were to be for widebody aircraft. But this was never to happen: on 15 July 1974 right wing Greek nationalists overthrew the democratically elected president of Cyprus, Archbishop Makarios. Nicosia Airport was briefly closed by the occupiers, then used on 17 July 1974 to ferry troops from Greece to Cyprus to support the coup against Makarios. Only on 18 July was it allowed to reopen to civilian traffic, becoming a site of chaotic scenes as holidaymakers and other foreign nationals tried to leave the island. Finally, on 20 July 1974, Turkey invaded Cyprus, bombing the airport heavily and a ground attack of multiple battalions also ensued. However, the Hellenic Force in Cyprus and Cypriot National Guard Special Forces defended against the attack. After the invasion the airport came under United Nations (UN) control, and it is still under UN control to this day.

The leaders of the Greek Cypriot Community and Turkish Cypriot Community discussed reopening Nicosia International Airport at the beginning of 1975. After the leader of the Greek Cypriot community, Archbishop Makarios, had initially rejected the Turkish Cypriot proposal to reopen the airport to international traffic under joint control, agreement to reopen it was 'in principle' reached during the negotiations in Vienna from 28 April to 3 May 1975. However, discussions by a joint committee set up for that purpose were unproductive.

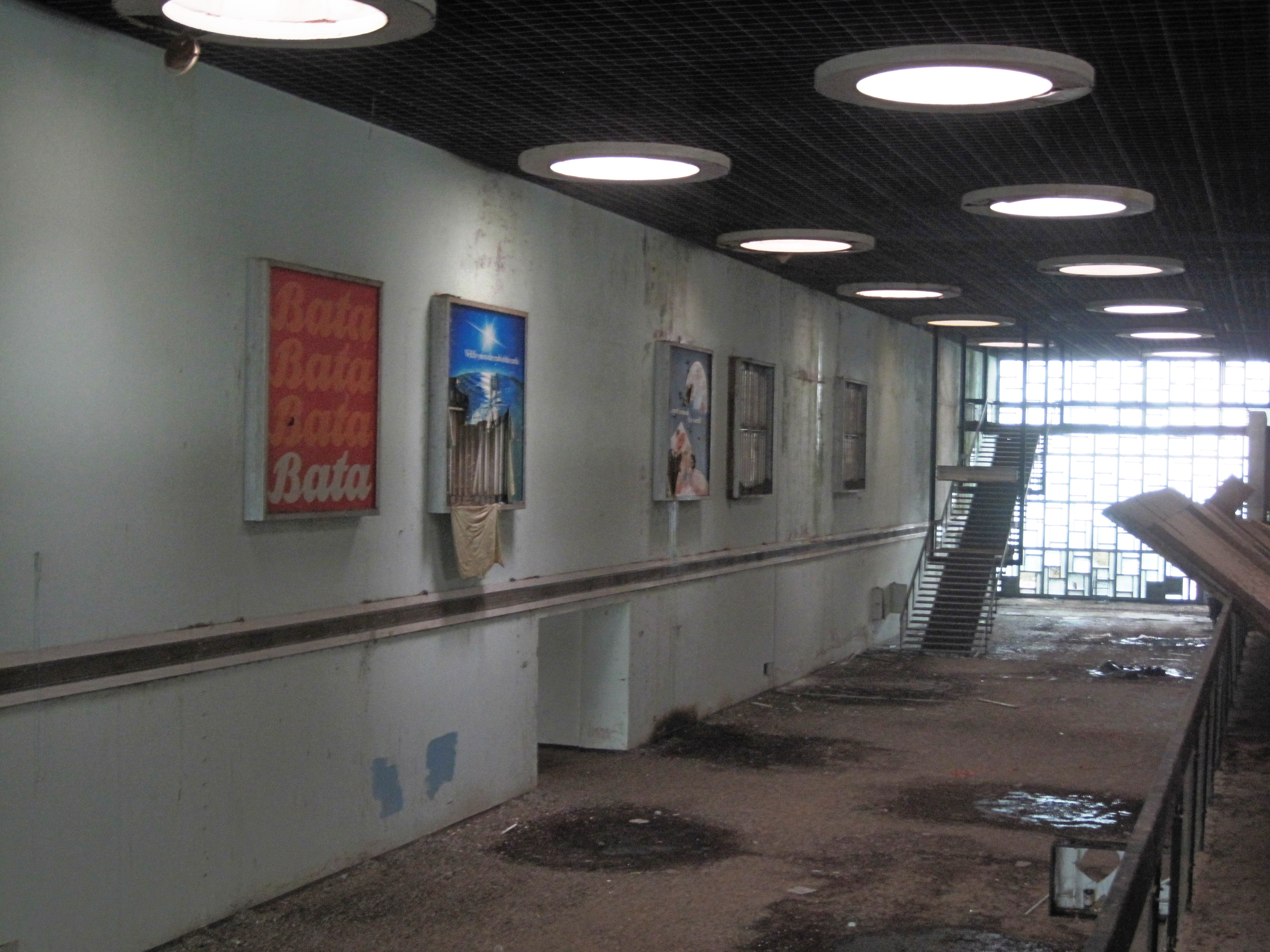
The airport arrivals hall closed after the Turkish invasion in 1974 still has some advertisement posters., e.g. Bata (from 1970).

The last commercial airline flights out of Nicosia Airport took place in 1977 under UN Special Authorisation, when three of the remaining Cyprus Airways aircraft stranded there since the 1974 invasion were retrieved by British Airways engineers and flown to London. One of these, a Hawker Siddeley Trident 2E, is now on show at the Imperial War Museum Duxford. The last remaining aircraft at the airport, also a Hawker Siddeley Trident 2E, was only four years old when damaged beyond repair by Turkish troops on 22 July 1974, and remains parked on the tarmac as of 2025.

Following the Turkish invasion, the airport was the scene of some of the heaviest fighting between Cypriot and Turkish forces, which led the United Nations Security Council to declare it a United Nations Protected Area (UNPA) during the conflict. This required both sides to withdraw at least 500 metres (1,600 ft) from the perimeter of the airport. With the ceasefire signed on 16 August 1974 Nicosia Airport became part of the United Nations controlled Buffer Zone separating the two communities on the island, and it has been inoperable as a fully functioning airport ever since. However, active United Nations helicopters are based at the site, which is used as the headquarters for the UN peace keeping mission in Cyprus UNFICYP and is used as one of the sites for intercommunal peace talks. It is also the home to a number of recreational facilities for UN personnel.

Following the closure of Nicosia Airport, a new airport in Larnaca was opened in the Republic of Cyprus in 1975, while Northern Cyprus established Ercan International Airport in 2004, both on former RAF airfields. Ercan is not considered by the Government of the Republic of Cyprus as a legal entry or exit point, thus flights from it go only to Turkey. Paphos International Airport was also opened in the Republic of Cyprus in 1983.

There have been plans proposed for Nicosia Airport to be reopened under UN control as a goodwill measure, but so far neither the Greek Cypriots nor the Turkish Cypriots have seriously pursued the option.

In 2013, Michael Paraskos of the Cornaro Institute in Cyprus argued that the old Nicosia Airport would no longer be needed in the event of a political settlement on the island, due to there being three other functioning airports in Cyprus. It was suggested it should be turned into a tax-free industrial zone, designed to attract foreign high tech firms, and employing Cypriots from both the Greek and Turkish communities on the island.

The NIC platform, implemented by the Cyprus Institute in collaboration with the UNFICYP, and released in August 2022, includes a full virtual tour of all accessible areas of the main terminal, the control tower, the hangar, and the three planes sitting in the airport premises. Additionally, the NIC platform features a collection of historical images and videos which aims to open a window to the days when the airport was fully operational and visited by numerous holiday makers.

In 2026, a group of Greek Cypriots and Turkish Cypriots, led by Alexis Sophocleous set foot in the Airport since the Invasion, announcing to turn it into a Museum for all tourists coming to visit Nicosia, with pictures showing future pathways inside of the Former Airport.

== Incidents and accidents ==
- On 3 March 1956, a Handley Page Hermes (a Hermes IV G-ALDW operated by Skyways Limited) was destroyed on the ground by a time-bomb in the forward freight compartment. The explosion occurred 20 minutes before the aircraft was due to depart for the United Kingdom with 68 passengers. There were no fatalities.
- On 27 April 1956, an RAF Douglas Dakota was destroyed on the ground by a bomb thought to have been placed by EOKA fighters.
- On 20 April 1967, a Swiss Globe Air Bristol Britannia crashed on approach to the airport in bad weather, 126 killed, 4 survivors.
- On 29 January 1973, an EgyptAir Ilyushin Il-18 aircraft (Reg No SU-AOV) crashed into the Pentadaktylos mountain range on approach to the airport, killing all 37 aboard (7 crew and 30 passengers).
- On 29 August 1973, a Czechoslovak Airlines Tupolev Tu-104 operating flight CSA531 from Damascus overran the runway upon landing. The aircraft was due to fly onwards to Prague from Nicosia. No fatalities were reported on the flight, and the wreckage of the aircraft is still close to the airport.
- On 20 July 1974, two empty Cyprus Airways airliners (a Hawker-Siddeley HS121 Trident 1E (5B-DAE), and a Trident 2E (5B-DAB)) were destroyed on the ground by fighter jets of the Turkish Air Force during the Turkish invasion of Cyprus.
- On 22 July 1974, 33 servicemen were killed when several Nord Noratlas of the Greek 354 Transport Squadron were engaged by friendly fire whilst airlifting a Greek commando force to protect the airport from invading Turkish troops. This operation was named Operation Niki.
