= Air combat during the Turkish invasion of Cyprus =

On 20 July 1974, Turkey launched a combined air and sea invasion of the northern portion of the island of Cyprus following a coup by the Athens-backed Cypriot National Guard against the democratically elected president, Archbishop Makarios III. The Turkish Government cited the protection of the Turkish Cypriot minority of Cyprus as its main justification for the military attack, in contradiction of the terms of the 1960 Treaty of Guarantee.

== Cyprus National Guard Air Command ==
The Cyprus National Guard first formed an organised military Air Wing on 16 August 1960, shortly after the island gained its independence from Britain. This force was equipped with a small number of light aircraft, and shared a joint command with the air-defence forces of the island and the Police.

In 1963 was formed the Cyprus Air Command (Αεροπορική Διοίκηση Κύπρου – Α.Δ.Κ./ADK) with its headquarters in Nicosia and two squadrons under its command – the 419 Air Base Protection Squadron (Μοίρα Προστασίας Αεροδρομίου – Μ.Π.Α./MPA) and 420 Air Base Protection Squadron at Lakatamia and Tymbou Airbases respectively. In June 1964 the 1 Air squad (Σμήνος Αεροσκαφών – Σ.Α./SA) was formed in cooperation with the Police force. This unit operated two Piper PA-22 Colt, a L-21B Piper Cub, a Beech C-45, Dornier Do-27Q, plus two AB-47J helicopters. Efforts were made with the cooperation of Greece for the acquisition of more modern jets, with limited success. In August 1964 the CNG/AC possessed five combat-capable T-6A Harvard attack planes which had been sent secretly from Greece, but they were returned to Greece few days later due to political considerations. At the same period – in 1964–65 the Cypriot Government had considered procuring eight Yak-11 or MiG-17 combat aircraft and SA-2 Guideline Surface-to-air missiles from the Soviet Union, but these plans also had been scrapped due to political sensitivities.

In 1964, and then again, in 1966, were created two radar Warning and Control Station Squadrons (Μοίρα Σταθμού Ελέγχου και Προειδοποίησης – Μ.Σ.Ε.Π./MSEP) – 3-rd on Mt. Kormakitis and 4 on Mt. Kantara. In 1968 the Police and ADK separated their activities and only two aircraft remained under ADK command: a Beech C-45 (D-6) and, reportedly, a L-21B Piper Cub (D-7).

=== The order of battle in 1974 ===
- Airplane Squadron (Μοίρα Αεροσκαφών)- Lakatamia
- Air Control Centre (Αεροπορικό Κέντρο Ελέγχου) – Nicosia
- 419 MPA – Lakatamia Air Base
- 420 MPA – Tymbou Air Base
- 3 MSEP – Mt. Kormakitis
- 4 MSEP – Mt. Kantara

== Cyprus National Guard Artillery Command ==
This force had inherited a considerable quantity of military equipment from Great Britain, and efforts had been made to augment anti-aircraft equipment with supplies from the Soviet Union and Yugoslavia. By 1974, the CNG Artillery Command possessed anti-aircraft flak guns of 12.7 mm, 14.5 mm, 20 mm, 40 mm and 104 mm from various sources, the smaller calibres distributed across most of its battalions.

== Turkish Air Force ==
This force was heavily committed to operations over Cyprus for the duration of the 1974 invasion, and consisted of multiple fighter squadrons equipped with F-5, RF-84F, F-100, F-102 and F-104 combat aircraft, as well as C-130, C-160 and C-47 transport planes.

== Turkish Army Air Corps ==
This force is composed primarily of Bell-model UH-1H and Bell 206 helicopters as well as Dornier Do 27 special operations fixed-wing aircraft.

== Hellenic Air Force ==
During the invasion, the H.A.F had a fleet of nearly 350 fighter aircraft. Up until July 1974, Greece had the first ready for action F-4 Phantoms squadron.

== See also ==
- Turkish invasion of Cyprus
- Military operations during the Invasion of Cyprus (1974)
- Cyprus dispute
