= Greek ship Lesvos =

At least two ships of the Hellenic Navy have borne the name Lesvos or Lesbos (Greek: Λέσβος), after the Greek island of Lesbos:

- Greek landing ship Lesvos (L172), a LST-1-class tank landing ship launched in 1942 as USS LST-389 and renamed USS Boone County in 1955. She was transferred to Greece in 1960 and renamed Lesvos. She was decommissioned in 1990.
- Greek landing ship Lesvos (L176), a Jason-class tank landing ship commissioned in 1999.
