= Eleftherios Handrinos =

Greek naval officer (1937–1994)

- Ελευθέριος Χανδρινός
- Born: 18 September 1937; Komotini
- Died: 27 July 1994 (aged 56); Athens
- Education: Hellenic Naval Academy; Hellenic Naval War College
- Spouse: Amalia Gavriil (m. 1963)
- Children: 2
- Military career
- Allegiance: Kingdom of Greece (1954–73); Hellenic Republic (1973–92)
- Branch: Hellenic Navy
- Service years: 1954–1992
- Rank: Vice Admiral
- Service number: 1064
- Known for: Commander of Lesvos (L-172) during the Turkish invasion of Cyprus
- Conflicts: Turkish invasion of Cyprus
- Awards: Gold Cross of the Order of George I Gold Cross of the Royal Order of the Phoenix; Medal of Military Merit 1st Class; Commander of the Order of Honour posthumously: Cyprus Operations Commemorative Medal (Greece); Commendation Medal Star of Merit and Honour

Eleftherios Handrinos (also spelled Chandrinos, Greek: Ελευθέριος Χανδρινός; 18 September 1937 – 27 July 1994) was a Hellenic Navy officer who retired with the rank of vice admiral. He is notable for his involvement in the first Turkish invasion of Cyprus, during which he commanded an LST vessel that caused confusion among Turkish commanders, leading to the loss of a Turkish destroyer due to friendly fire. He also served as a naval attaché in Ankara.

== Early life and career ==
Handrinos was born in Komotini to parents who came from the island of Corfu. His parents were Konstantinos, a major general in the Greek Army who was serving in Thrace at the time, and Maria Handrinou (née Drazinou). At the age of fourteen, his family moved to Athens and in 1954 he entered the Hellenic Naval Academy, graduating as an ensign in June 1958. Following his graduation, he served on several navy ships and was trained on anti-submarine warfare in the United States. For a period of four years, he also served with the 353 Naval Collaboration Squadron (353 MNAS) flying with SHU-16B aircraft.

== Cyprus 1974 ==
=== Background ===
On 15 July 1974, a military coup d'état orchestrated by the right-wing military junta of Athens and the Cypriot National Guard deposed the Cypriot President Makarios. With the pretext of a peacekeeping operation, Turkey took military action and invaded Cyprus west of Kyrenia in the dawn of 20 July 1974.

=== Famagusta mission ===
L-172 Lesvos.

In the summer of 1974, Handrinos had risen to the rank of Lieutenant commander. Since 1 August 1973, he had been commanding landing ship Lesvos (L-172, ex USS Boone County). On 12 July 1974, Lesvos was scheduled to depart from the small harbour of Kechries in Corinthia bound for Famagusta, carrying 450 replacement personnel and provisions for the permanent Hellenic Force in Cyprus (ELDYK). The estimated time for arrival in Famagusta was the early morning of July 17. The departure was delayed for 24 hours and the ship sailed on the late evening of July 13. En route to Cyprus, the ship picked up broadcasts by the radio station of Nicosia, from which Handrinos was informed about the coup that had been launched against President Makarios. On July 16, while the ship was off the coast of Limassol, the Hellenic Navy HQ ordered Handrinos to return to Greek waters by changing course towards Lindos in Rhodes. This was probably due to the Greek junta being unwilling to give the impression of reinforcing the Greek forces on Cyprus. As the situation in Cyprus became more stable and the coup seemed successful, Handrinos was ordered to sail again towards Cyprus. In the afternoon of July 19, only a few hours before the Turkish invasion, Lesvos dropped anchor in the port of Famagusta. After the disembarkation of the replacement troops, another 450 soldiers who were being discharged or relocated from ELDYK to Greece came aboard. The ship then departed at around 18:00 heading for Greece.

Locations of Famagusta, Limassol, Paphos, Kyrenia and Nicosia on Cyprus.

=== Shelling at Paphos ===
In the morning of July 20, Handrinos was informed by a radio broadcast about the ongoing Turkish invasion. Soon after, when Lesvos was approximately 40 nmi (74 km) from Paphos, Handrinos received an order to sail east and disembark in Limassol the troops he had picked up the day before. This order was later canceled, and the ship was ordered to sail to Paphos. In his official report, Handrinos notes that the return to Cyprus and the prospect of fighting against the invading Turkish forces was welcomed with enthusiasm by the troops onboard Lesvos.

At around 14:00, Lesvos anchored off the port of Paphos and the troops begun to be offloaded with small landing crafts. While the disembarkation was still in progress, Handrinos was asked by the local commander of the Cypriot National Guard to attack the fortified positions of Turkish and Turkish Cypriot forces in the nearby enclave of Mouttalos (Greek: Μούτταλος). Without clear rules of engagement from Athens, Handrinos decided to bombard the enclave with the ship's twin 40 mm Bofors guns. Due to the lack of sufficient naval personnel onboard Lesvos, its guns were manned by ELDYK men who had received brief, on the spot training while at sea earlier that day. Over 900 shells were fired in a period of two hours, which exceeded the time required for disembarkation and resulted in the surrender of two heavily armed Turkish companies.

Handrinos was aware that his slow and lightly armed ship was an easy target for patrolling Turkish warships and jet fighters. Therefore, in the late afternoon of July 20 and immediately after the shelling, he departed Paphos to seek cover in the coming darkness. Knowing that the Turkish Air Force would search for his ship in the sea region between Cyprus and Rhodes, Handrinos executed an evasive maneuver by first steering his ship south towards Egypt, later heading west and turning north towards Crete only when he was more than 60 nmi (110 km) away from Cyprus. In this manner, Lesvos managed to remain undetected and safely reached Salamis naval base on July 23, after an intermediate stop at Sitia.

=== Aftermath ===
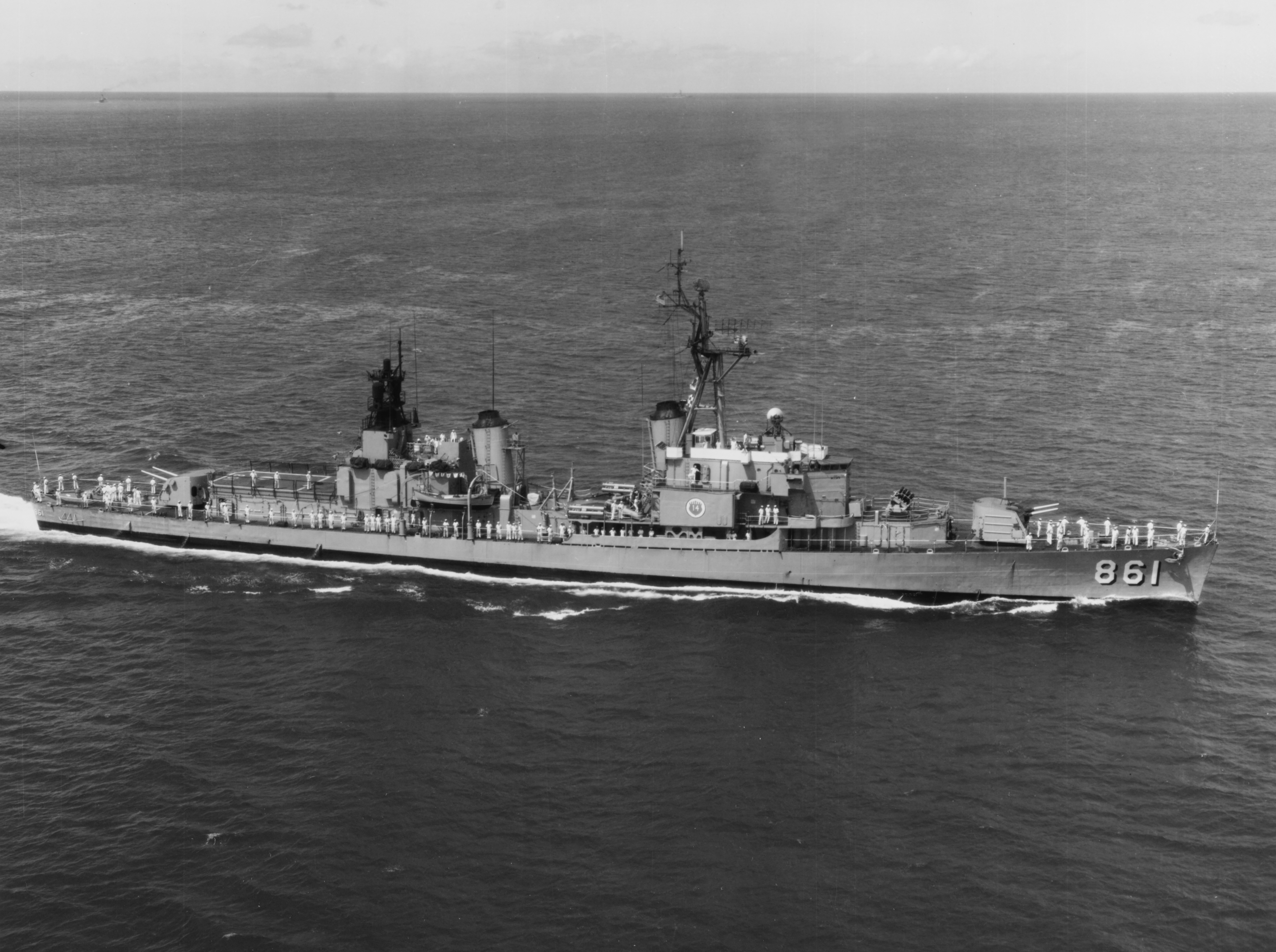
USS Harwood, later TCG Kocatepe (D 354) of the Turkish Navy.

Despite not being a front line ship, Lesvos was the only vessel of the Hellenic Navy that fought during the Turkish invasion in Cyprus. A direct consequence of the Paphos bombardment was that it neutralized the Turkish stronghold and helped decisively to maintain the city in Greek hands. The troops which were disembarked at Paphos were transported by buses to the ELDYK barracks in Nicosia. They assumed active combat duties and fought gallantly during the second phase of the Turkish invasion in mid August 1974.

As a result of the shelling at Paphos, Turkish reports about an escorted Greek ship convoy carrying reinforcements started to float around. The confusion was further aggravated by radio conversations among National Guard units, who knowing that their communications were being monitored, intentionally mentioned that Greek Navy vessels were off Paphos. Based on these reports, in the morning of 21 July the Turkish naval command ordered three destroyers accompanying the landing force at Kyrenia to sail west and intercept the supposed Greek convoy. These were TCG Kocatepe (D 354), TCG Adatepe (D 353) and TCG Mareşal Fevzi Çakmak (D 351). Around noon, the destroyers were heading south towards Paphos but were unable to spot any ships. In the meantime, the Turkish air force had received reports who mistook the three Turkish destroyers as being Greek and had ordered their sinking. Thus, around 14:00, three Turkish air force squadrons (namely 181, 141 and 111 Filo) totaling 48 F-100D and F-104G aircraft armed with bombs and rockets, took off from three different airports in southern Turkey. The Turkish destroyers were spotted by the aircraft pilots at 15:00, who noticed that they were flying Turkish flags. Considering this to be a Greek deception, they started to fire their rockets and drop their bombs at the destroyers, which responded with anti-aircraft guns. Eventually, the ships managed to identify the attacking aircraft. Despite repeated attempts by the Turkish ships to convince the pilots about their nationality, the air attacks continued. (Note: Birand reports that Çakmak was carrying a downed Turkish pilot who had been rescued from the sea on the previous day (20 July). This pilot came to the radio and asked his colleagues to abort the attacks. When they asked for the current password, he was unaware of it, hence his pleas were ignored.) The strikes resulted in Kocatepe being sunk and taking with her several dozens of sailors, Adatepe being extensively damaged and Çakmak suffering minor damage. At least one aircraft was also shot down by anti-aircraft fire.

== Later life ==
In 1982, Handrinos was promoted to captain and in 1984 he was appointed as a military attaché in Ankara. In May 1986, while driving near Komotini en route from Athens to Ankara for the handover of his duties and the return of the diplomatic vehicle, Handrinos was seriously injured in a car accident in which the car was totaled. The cause of that accident was not determined, and Handrinos never fully recovered from it. He was retired on 19 May 1987 with the rank of Commodore, but his retirement was administratively annulled in 1991 after a relevant Council of State decision, then retired again in October 1991 (retroactively to September 3rd, 1989) and then again retroactively reinstated, promoted to Yponavarchos and retired with the rank of Antinavarchos in April 1992 (retroactively to March 18, 1991).

As was the case with other Greek soldiers who saw military action in Cyprus, Handrinos received no extraordinary honors for, or public recognition of his actions in Cyprus while he was alive. He was posthumously honored only in 2002, receiving the Cyprus Operations Commemorative medal (authorised by Presidential Decree 9/2001) and 2015 with the Commendation Medal Star of Merit and Honour. For several decades after the restoration of democracy, the rationale of the Greek state was that since Greece was not officially at war with Turkey in 1974, no combat operations involving Greeks could have taken place.

Eleutherios Handrinos died on 27 July 1994, survived by his wife and two daughters. Roads in his native island of Corfu and in Paphos bear his name.

== See also ==
- Military operations during the Turkish invasion of Cyprus
- Cyprus dispute
