= USS LST-389 =

1942 LST-1-class tank landing ship

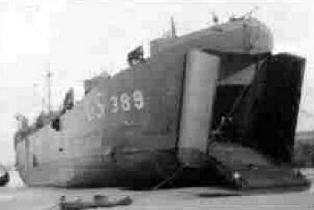
- LST-389 beached in the harbor at Cherbourg-Octeville after running over a sunken ship in the inner harbor.

History

United States
- Name: USS LST-389
- Builder: Newport News Shipbuilding and Drydock Company
- Laid down: 7 September 1942
- Launched: 16 September 1942
- Commissioned: 22 December 1942
- Decommissioned: 2 July 1946
- Honors and awards: 3 battle stars (WWII)
- Renamed: USS Boone County (LST-389), 1 July 1955
- Namesake: Boone County
- Stricken: 1 June 1959
- Fate: Transferred to Greece, June 1960

Greece
- Name: Lesvos (L172)
- Acquired: 2 June 1960
- Decommissioned: 15 May 1990

General characteristics
- Class & type: LST-1-class tank landing ship
- Displacement: 1,625 long tons (1,651 t) light; 4,080 long tons (4,145 t) full
- Length: 328 ft (100 m)
- Beam: 50 ft (15 m)
- Draft: Unloaded: Bow: 2 ft 4 in (0.71 m); Stern: 7 ft 6 in (2.29 m); Loaded : Bow: 8 ft 2 in (2.49 m); Stern: 14 ft 1 in (4.29 m)
- Depth: 8 ft (2.4 m) forward; 14 ft 4 in (4.37 m) aft (full load)
- Propulsion: 2 General Motors 12-567 diesel engines, two shafts, twin rudders
- Speed: 12 knots (22 km/h; 14 mph)
- Boats & landing craft carried: Two or six LCVPs
- Troops: 14-16 officers, 131-147 enlisted men
- Complement: 7-9 officers, 104-120 enlisted men
- Armament: 2 × twin 40 mm gun mounts w/Mk.51 directors; 4 × single 40 mm gun mounts; 12 × single 20 mm gun mounts

USS Boone County (LST-389) was an LST-1-class tank landing ship built for the United States Navy during World War II. Named for counties in Arkansas, Illinois, Indiana, Iowa, Kentucky, Missouri, Nebraska, and West Virginia, she was the only U.S. Naval vessel to bear the name.

LST-389 was laid down on 20 June 1942 at Newport News, Virginia by the Newport News Shipbuilding and Dry Dock Company; launched on 28 September 1942; sponsored by Miss Clara Elizabeth Ashe; and commissioned on 24 November 1942.

== Service history ==
=== Mediterranean, 1942–1944 ===
After shakedown training in the Chesapeake Bay, during which she also served as training ship for crews to be assigned to other tank landing ships, LST-389 departed Norfolk, Virginia on 19 February 1943, bound for Bayonne, New Jersey where she took on board one tank landing craft (LCT), United States Army troops, and a cargo of medical supplies. Sailing with convoy UGS 6A on 19 March, she proceeded via Bermuda to North Africa and reached Nemours, Algeria on 13 April. Soon shifting to the Arzew Naval Base, Algeria the ship became the flagship for Captain Frank Adams, Commander, LST Group 5, Flotilla 2. LST-389 was soon involved in the campaign to invade Sicily, a steppingstone to Italy.

==== Sicily ====
At 0905 on 8 July 1943 she beached at Scoglitti, Sicily and unloaded part of her cargo before retracting at 1030. The ship next beached at Bracette Point, Sicily at 1850, and disembarked troops and unloaded mobile equipment before she pulled free of the beach at 1958 to anchor off Cape Scalambri. At 2200 that evening, she witnessed numerous flares, bomb bursts, and artillery fire over the beach, two or three miles (5 km) away, indicating that fierce fighting was still in progress on shore. At 1000 the following morning, the tank landing ship got underway and soon thereafter, beached south of Bracette Point, where she then discharged her tanks and vehicles. That day, LST-389 suffered damage in a collision when LST-5 could not change course in time to clear her while retracting. The two ships scraped each other and LST-5's anchor ripped a large hole in LST-389's starboard side.

Over the next few days, enemy air power did its best to thwart the landings. Almost continuous air attacks harried the ships offshore on the evening of 9 July. On the 12th, she spent most of the day loading ammunition. On the 13th, she beached at Beach Red 1 and spent much of the day there, unloading the remainder of her cargo. At 2150 that day, an enemy plane dropped four bombs nearby. The closest landed on her starboard beam about 50 yards (46 m) away, but it caused no damage. Underway for Bizerte on 16 July, LST-389 arrived there two days later for 10 days of repairs. She then sailed for Licata, Sicily and from that port made three trips to Palermo to lift Army troops and vehicles. Late in August, LST-389 was fitted with a pontoon causeway section to be used during the invasion of the Italian mainland. She got underway on 1 September and soon joined a convoy for Italy. On the night of 8 September, on her way to the landing beaches, LST-389 observed two twin-engine German bombers attack accompanying minesweepers, narrowly missing them. For the balance of the night, frequent air raids prompted equally frequent orders to general quarters, but the tank landing ship survived many near misses without a scratch.

==== Salerno ====
On 9 September, Vice Admiral H. Kent Hewitt's Western Naval Task Force began landing Lieutenant General Mark W. Clark's Allied 5th Army on the shores of the Gulf of Salerno. At 0855, LST-389 received orders to proceed to beach "Blue" near Agripoli. After minesweepers had cleared a path, exploding three mines in the process, LST-389 started in. As the ship moved shoreward, shells exploded in the water and on the beach from enemy guns, which earlier that morning had driven off six tank-laden LCT's. The ship ground onto the strand at 1241, but soon received orders to move to the more tenable "Red" beach. Heavy German artillery and machine gun fire continued to pound and sweep "Blue" beach so severely that it was dubbed one of the two invasion points "most difficult for the invaders to negotiate." Under heavy fire, LST 389 attempted to comply with the orders but could not. Stuck fast to "Blue" beach, the gallant tank landing ship then proceeded to carry out her original orders. Her crew deployed the pontoon unit; and, a little over an hour later at 1354, the first tank roared out of the ship's gaping bow doors. By the time she finally managed to clear the beach at 1509, LST-389 had endured much at the hands of German gunners. Some 60 shells had been fired at the ship. At 1313, a shell demolished the captain's cabin while wounding a number of men. Fire sweeping the exposed bridge prompted its abandonment, but two volunteers remained to maintain uninterrupted telephone contact with all stations on board. The crew of her lone 3-inch (76 mm) gun claimed to have silenced two or three of the deadly German 88-millimeter guns.

Even after leaving "Blue" beach, LST 389 came under attack, this time from enemy bombers. Eighteen bombs fell close by that night, but caused no damage to the ship. The next night, heavy air attacks upon the ships commenced at 2220. Less than 20 minutes later, four bombs fell close aboard LST-389, and, over the next half hour, nine more exploded nearby. Meanwhile, the ship's 20-millimeter batteries kept the intruders under constant fire and scored a "few" hits. On the other hand, a 20-millimeter shell (probably from an adjacent ship) exploded on the main deck just forward of the wheelhouse, wounding two LST 389 crewmen. The next morning, 11 September, seven more bombs burst close aboard, again jostling the ship. At about 0930, a glider bomb disabled the nearby light cruiser USS Savannah. Finally departing Salerno on 11 September, LST-389 sailed to Milazzo, Sicily to await orders which came soon and took her back to Salerno with elements of the famed British 8th Army embarked. During the remainder of September, LST-389 made four more such trips followed by several runs carrying troops and supplies between Tripoli and Salerno. Released from this duty on 2 October, the ship proceeded to Oran, Algeria for repairs to the damage she had received at Salerno.

=== Invasion of France, 1944–1945 ===
Clearing Oran on 12 November LST-389 sailed for England in MKS-30, a convoy which endured a glider-bomb attack, launched by German Dornier bombers, without suffering any losses. Shortly before Thanksgiving the ship, now a veteran of two major amphibious landings, arrived at Plymouth and waited for orders. Following a period in drydock there for minor repairs beginning on 13 December, LST-389 departed Plymouth on 20 December and reached Falmouth the same day. On Christmas Eve, she started preparing for the invasion of France.

"With the beginning of 1944..." wrote the ship's historian, "...the ship moved from place to place, beaching, retracting, learning the new methods of war." Finally ending up in the Welsh port of Milford Haven, LST-389 stayed there for the rest of January and all of February before shifting to Swansea, Wales for more training. After operating there until 27 April, LST-389 proceeded to Lisahally on the shore of Lough Foyle in Northern Ireland to receive six 40-millimeter and six 20-millimeter guns. Following more repairs and alterations at Milford Haven, LST-389 spent the rest of May training for the assault on Hitler's "Atlantic Wall." Loading Army vehicles and embarking troops at Falmouth on 2 June 1944 she got underway on 4 June and proceeded to the task force anchorage where the ship lay until setting out for France on the following morning. After anchoring in Baie de la Seine at 0927 on 7 June, she began resupply operations for the Normandy beachhead that afternoon. One of her LCVP coxswains suffered wounds at 1645 when his craft was hit on its way to the beach. The next morning, German planes braved heavy antiaircraft fire to attack the shipping off the invasion beaches. Four bombs landed in the sea near LST-389 causing "minor hull vibrations." The tank landing ship unloaded her embarked vehicles that afternoon, 8 June, and survived another nocturnal bombing attack at 0034 on the 9th before getting underway for Southampton later that morning.

For the rest of June, LST-389 shuttled supplies and men between Southampton and various beaches along the northern coast of France. Her cargoes included food, medical supplies, and vehicles. After the port's capture by the Allies in July, she added Cherbourg to her itinerary and, railroad tracks having been installed in her tank deck, began carrying rolling stock in early September. In the course of these train-ferrying operations, LST-389 struck an underwater obstruction at Grand Rade, Cherbourg, on 12 November. Major leaks in her main engine room resulted. Unable to make any headway against the rising water, the tank landing ship, aided by two tugboats, was beached. Seven hours of shoring, patching, and pumping freed the engine room of unwanted water. With the aid of British tugs, LST-389 then completed her ferry mission before LST-355 towed her back to Devonport, England. Following major repairs in drydock, the ship received an overhaul alongside Atlas before resuming active service in mid-January 1945. She again shuttled railroad cars and passengers between England and France. While returning from Le Havre to Portland, Dorset, early on the fog-shrouded morning of 5 February, LST-389 was rammed by the civilian merchantman SS Chapel Hill Victory. The collision ripped a hole 18 feet (5.5 m) wide in the tank landing ship from main deck to bottom and killed one member of her crew. LST-389 then proceeded to Portland under her own power. After a week at anchor off Portland, LST-389 put into Plymouth for another drydocking which lasted into late March. LST-389 next made one trip carrying vehicles to Cherbourg and two more to Le Havre before she had LCT skids installed on her main deck at Falmouth.

=== Return to the US, 1945 ===
Picking up LCT-814 and a "general cargo" at Plymouth, LST-389 put into Belfast, Northern Ireland on 8 May, the day after Germany surrendered. On the 11th, she sailed in a convoy bound for the United States and reached Norfolk on the last day of the month. Following overhaul at New York, the ship proceeded to Little Creek, Virginia on 5 September 1945. Since the war in the Pacific had ceased in mid-August, LST-389's orders to proceed to that area of the world were cancelled. Instead, she returned to New York to pick up another LCT and then sailed for Jacksonville, Florida.

=== Decommissioning and transfer, 1945–1960 ===
She arrived at the Inactive Fleet Berthing Area at Green Cove Springs, Florida on 9 October 1945 and reported for duty with the Inactive Fleet. Decommissioned on 12 March 1946 she was placed in reserve on 1 July 1946. LST-389 remained in reserve, first at Green Cove Springs and later at Charleston, Mayport, and again in Green Cove Springs, through the 1950s. While inactive, she was named USS Boone County (LST-389) on 1 July 1955. Her name was struck from the Naval Vessel Register on 1 June 1959.

LST-389 received three battle stars for her World War II service.

== Greek service ==
She was transferred to Greece in May, 1960 and was renamed Lesvos with a pennant of L172. During her service with the Hellenic Navy, she was involved in combat action in Cyprus on 20 July 1974 (CO Lt Cdr E. Handrinos, HN). On that day, she was in the Paphos area on a scheduled mission, carrying replacement personnel to the permanent Greek military force based in Cyprus (ELDYK). As the Turkish invasion of Cyprus had started a few hours earlier, she shelled the Turkish Cypriot garrison of Paphos with her 40 mm guns, forcing them to surrender. The shelling spawned reports about a Greek ship convoy carrying reinforcements to Cyprus and three Turkish destroyers were ordered to intercept the supposed Greek convoy. The Turkish air force mistook these destroyers for being Greek and sunk one of them (D 354 Kocatepe) in a friendly fire exchange.
