= Boone County =

Boone County may refer to:

- Boone County, Arkansas
- Boone County, Illinois
- Boone County, Indiana
- Boone County, Iowa
- Boone County, Kentucky
- Boone County, Missouri
- Boone County, Nebraska
- Boone County, West Virginia
- USS Boone County (LST-389)
