= Reported military losses during the Turkish invasion of Cyprus =

On 20 July 1974, the armed forces of Turkey invaded the northern portion of the Republic of Cyprus in response to the Greek military junta-backed 1974 Cypriot coup d'état that took place on the island against the country's democratically elected president, Archbishop Makarios III. The initial phase of the Turkish invasion, commonly referred to as "Attila-1", lasted until 24 July 1974, after which the offensive faltered and a ground war ensued.

On 14 August 1974, the Turkish armed forces in northern Cyprus had been sufficiently reinforced to the extent that they were able to launch a second major offensive, "Attila-2", which expanded the area under its control to approximately 38% of the land mass by 18 August 1974 and the end of hostilities by cease fire.

== Attila 1 Offensive (20–23 July 1974) ==
=== 20 July 1974 ===
Type	Equipment	Owner	Unit	Location	Number Lost	Notes
Motor Torpedo Boat	P-4 Skinhead	Cyprus Navy	Kyrenia Squadron	North of Kyrenia	2	The vessels T-1 and T-3 were dispatched to engage the first Turkish flotilla as it approached Kyrenia. One vessel was destroyed by air attack, and the other by artillery from a Turkish destroyer.
Artillery	25-pounder	Cyprus National Guard	182 Artillery Battalion	Lapithou-Kyrenia highway	2	This battalion lost two artillery pieces in a road accident whilst moving to their firing positions in the opening hour of the invasion.
Medium Tank	T-34/85	Cyprus National Guard	251 Infantry Battalion	Five Mile Beach (Pentemili) in Kyrenia	5	Five vehicles were seconded to the 251 Infantry battalion from the 23 Medium Tank Battalion prior to 15 July 1974 to support the aspects of the coup in Kyrenia and guard against a Turkish landing there. All five were lost in an assault on the Turkish beachhead (four were destroyed by infantry-portable light anti-tank weapons, the fifth was abandoned with mechanical failure).
Armoured Personnel Carrier	M113	Turkish Army	230 Mechanised Infantry Regiment (28 Division)	Five Mile Beach (Pentemili) in Kyrenia	2	20 M113 APCs of the 230 Mechanised Infantry Regiment (minus one battalion) were landed in the initial amphibious assault on Pentemili. With the Turkish tanks unable to wade ashore, a Greek Cypriot attack with tanks forced the M113s to attempt to support a confrontation. Consequently, the T-34 tanks destroyed two of the M113s with shots of 85mm HVAP ammunition.
Anti-Tank Weapons	Recoilless Rifles	Turkish Army	"Cakmak" Special Strike Force	Five Mile Beach (Pentemili) in Kyrenia	2	A heavy initial attack by Greek Cypriot T-34s with infantry support inflicted the destruction of two crew-served recoilless rifle nests – one an M40A1 106mm and the other an M18A1 57mm.
Medium Tank	T-34/85	Cyprus National Guard	Boufas Battle Group	Morphou-Kyrenia road, Kyrenia	1	A battle group (task force) led by Lt.Col Kostantinos Boufas included 3 T-34/85s sent from Morphou (23 Medium Tank Battalion). During the initial engagement with the Turkish western flank, one of the tanks was knocked out by a LAW light anti-tank weapon.
Medium Tank	T-34/85	Cyprus National Guard	Geunyeli Battle Group	Geunyeli Enclave, Nicosia	3	In a major coordinated attack on the Geunyeli fortifications, the 23 Medium Tank Battalion contributed 19 tanks to prevent a Turkish bridgehead from Kyrenia to Geunyeli. Two T-34s were destroyed by Turkish air attack, and a third became trapped in obstacles and was abandoned. The example was captured intact by Turkish forces.
Armoured Personnel Carrier	BTR-152V1	Cyprus National Guard	286 Mechanised Infantry Battalion	Kontemnos, Nicosia	6	In an attempt to circumnavigate the Geunyeli highway junction to Kyrenia, a 286 battalion convoy of armoured vehicles attempted to pass through Kontemnos village. Six BTR-152 vehicles were strafed and rocketed by Turkish fighter jets, causing them to burst into flames.
Artillery	25-pounder	Cyprus National Guard	181 Artillery Battalion	Syhari Village, Nicosia	1	One gun was immobilised after its wheels were destroyed by gunfire from a Turkish air attack. It was abandoned at Syhari as it could not be moved. This is not so. The 25-pounder was towed to the HQ company camp of 361 Infantry battalion at Syhari on 20 July with one flat tire. Later in the day a crew from 181 Artillery battalion came back to Syhari with an extra tire and a truck and retrieved the gun.
Artillery	Quad .50cal A/A	Cyprus National Guard	181 Artillery Battalion	Syhari Village, Nicosia	1	An anti-aircraft gun of the M55A4 type was destroyed by air-attack at Syhari at 10.30hrs. This is also not accurate. This was a quad 50 mounted on an WW II era Austin truck which barely made it to Syhari with mechanical trouble. It towed a twin 14.7 Russian AA gun. The towed gun was left at the intersection of the Mia Millia to Dikomo intersection, it was set up and fired against the Turkish F-100s that strifed the nearby camp. It was abandoned by retrieving National Guard forces there. The Austin with the quad 50 was parked just east of the main gate to the HQ company camp of 361 Infantry battalion at Syhari. Only 3 of the 4 barrels worked and it fired at the same F-100s that the 14.7 fired at. It was also abandoned there by the retreating National Guard forces as it was immobile.
General purpose vehicle	Bedford	Cyprus National Guard	181 Artillery Battalion	Syhari Village, Nicosia	2	Two general purpose vehicles were destroyed in the 10.30hrs air-attack at Syhari village.
Artillery	25-pounder	Cyprus National Guard	185 Artillery Battalion	Camp Andrew Karvos, Athalassas	5	A Turkish air attack was launched against this National Guard base in Nicosia at 05.20hrs. Rockets and napalm resulted in the destruction of five guns and most of the ammunition, as well as the loss of six personnel.
Artillery	25-pounder	Cyprus National Guard	187 Artillery Battalion	Camp Dimitri Christodolou, Athalassas	8	A massive Turkish air-raid on this camp in the early hours caught the battalion while it was still preparing to mobilise. Eight of the 12 artillery guns were destroyed and six personnel were killed.
Transport aircraft	Various	Turkish Air Force	Various	Northern Cyprus	3	During the first day of the Turkish air campaign, three transport planes – C-47 No.6035, a C-130 of 222.Filo and a C-160 of 221.Filo were damaged by Greek Cypriot anti-aircraft fire. All three salvaged, but played no further part in the conflict.
Fighter aircraft	F-100 Super Sabre	Turkish Air Force	Various	Northern Cyprus	2	During the first day of the conflict, F-100D 55-3756 of 171.Filo and F-100C 54-2042 of 132.Filo were shot down by A/A flak.
Fighter aircraft	RF-84F	Turkish Air Force	184 Filo	Northern Cyprus	1	During the first day of the conflict, an RF-84F reconnaissance aircraft of 184 Filo was shot down by Greek Cypriot A/A flak.
Aircraft	Dornier Do-28D	Turkish Air Force	Unknown	Northern Cyprus	1	During the first day of the conflict, a Dornier Do-28D of the Turkish Air Force was shot down north-west of Nicosia.

=== 21 July 1974 ===
Type	Equipment	Owner	Unit	Location	Number Lost	Notes
Warship	D-354 Kocatepe	Turkish Navy	Unknown	North West of Cyprus	1	The Turkish destroyer D-354 Kocatepe was erroneously attacked by Turkish fighter aircraft, resulting in the vessel being sunk with the loss of 54 crew.
Warship	D-353 Adatepe	Turkish Navy	Unknown	North West of Cyprus	1	The Turkish destroyer D-353 Adatepe was erroneously attacked and damaged by Turkish fighter aircraft. Casualties unknown. The vessel returned to port.
Warship	D-351 Mareşal Fevzi Çakmak	Turkish Navy	Unknown	North West of Cyprus	1	The Turkish destroyer D-351 Mareşal Fevzi Çakmak was erroneously attacked and damaged by Turkish fighter aircraft. Casualties unknown. The vessel returned to port.
Fighter aircraft	F-104G	Turkish Air Force	191 Filo	North West of Cyprus	1	Aircraft 64-17783 was lost in action on 21 July 1974.
Fighter aircraft	F-100C/D	Turkish Air Force	Various	Cyprus	2	F-100D 55-2825 of 111. Filo and 54-2083 of 112.Filo were both lost in action during the daytime air campaign on 21 July.
Motor torpedo boat	P-4 Skinhead	Cyprus Navy	Boghazi Squadron	Boghazi	1	The motor patrol boat T-2 accidentally ran aground at Boghazi and was abandoned. It was later captured on 18 August when Turkish forces captured the base.

=== 22 July 1974 ===
Type	Equipment	Owner	Unit	Location	Number Lost	Notes
Main Battle Tank	M47	Turkish Army	39th Divisional Tank Battalion	Nicosia Airport	5	Five Turkish M47 Patton tanks were lost along the western approach to Kyrenia during the day action as Turkish forces advanced on the city along the Five Mile Beach highway. 23 Casualties.
Armoured vehicle	ATS-712	Cyprus National Guard	241 Infantry Battalion	Kyrenia	1	A number of locally assembled ATS-712 or "TS" armoured vehicles were lost in action during the defence of the western flank of Kyrenia.
Fighter aircraft	F-100D	Turkish Air Force	Various	North Cyprus	2	Turkish F-100D Super Sabres 54-2238 of 172 Filo and 54-22?? of 171 Filo were lost in action on 22 July over Cyprus due to enemy fire.
Fighter aircraft	F-100C	Turkish Air Force	171 Filo	Turkey	1	A Turkish F-100C of 171 Filo was lost in a landing accident after returning from a combat sortie over Cyprus. Serial unknown.
Transport aircraft	Noratlas	Hellenic Air Force	Various	Nicosia Airport	3	Two aircraft (53-234 and 52-144) were accidentally damaged by Greek Cypriot anti-aircraft fire. They managed to land safely in Crete but played no further part in the conflict. See also: Operation Niki

=== 23 July 1974 ===
Type	Equipment	Owner	Unit	Location	Number lost	Notes
Main battle tank	M47	Turkish Army	39th Divisional Tank Battalion	Nicosia Airport	2	Two Turkish M47 tanks were lost during a failed diversionary manoeuvre to the east side of the main terminal, where they were engaged by a two-man M20 Super Bazooka crew of the 21 EAN and destroyed.
Artillery	75 mm	Cyprus National Guard	191 POP Artillery Company	Bellapais, Kyrenia	4	The entire company was encircled and eventually destroyed along with the 181 Artillery Battalion after being ambushed by Turkish forces at their firing positions at Bellapais.
Artillery	12.7 mm	Cyprus National Guard	191 POP Artillery Company	Bellapais, Kyrenia	3	These guns were amongst those lost when the 191 POP was ambushed.
Artillery	25-pounder	Cyprus National Guard	181 Artillery Battalion	Bellapais, Kyrenia	12	The entire 181 Artillery Battalion was annihilated, with the loss of all personnel, and ambushed the firing positions of the 181 battalion and 191 company. The battalion refused to surrender its guns and was wiped out.

== Clashes from 24 July to 13 August ==
=== 1 August ===
Type	Equipment	Owner	Unit	Location	Number Lost	Notes
Main battle tank	M47	Turkish Army	Unknown	Karavas	1	A single M47 tank was destroyed by a shot from a 3M6 Snapper anti-tank weapon just north of Karavas village, Kyrenia district. The tank was most likely of the 28th Divisional Tank Battalion.

=== 2 August ===
Type	Equipment	Owner	Unit	Location	Number Lost	Notes
Main Battle Tank	M47	Turkish Army	28th Divisional Tank Battalion	Kornos Hill, Kyrenia	2	Two M47 Patton tanks were lost in an ambush executed by sappers of the 316 TE. One of the vehicles was captured intact.
APC	M113	Turkish Army	230th Mechanised Infantry Regiment	Kornos Hill, Kyrenia	2	Two M113 APCs were lost in an ambush executed by sappers of the 316 TE on a narrow mountain dirt track at Kornos Hill. One was captured intact along with an M47 Patton.

=== 6 August ===
Type	Equipment	Owner	Unit	Location	Number Lost	Notes
Main Battle Tank	M47	Turkish Army	28th Divisional Tank Battalion	Vassilia, Kyrenia	2	Two M47 main battle tanks were lost in action during a battle at the village of Vassilia on 6 August. The tanks were supporting a manoeuvre by the Turkish 61st Infantry regiment.

== Attila 2 Offensive (14–18 August 1974) ==
=== 14 August ===
Type	Equipment	Owner	Unit	Location	Number Lost	Notes
Artillery	Six-Pounder	Cyprus National Guard	173rd Anti-Tank Battalion	Mia Millia	9	The 173 Battalion was contacted at its defensive positions at Mia Millia at 10.00hrs whilst supporting the 399 infantry battalion, and its lines were overrun by 10.30hrs. High Command (GEEF) ordered a retreat at 10.55hrs, and 9 of the 12 guns were lost at their firing positions.
Motor torpedo boat	P-4 Skinhead	Cyprus Navy	Boghazi Squadron	Boghazi	3	The T4, T5 and T6 vessels were scuttled by their own crews on 14 August as Turkish forces approached the naval base, with no fuel re-supply available to let the vessels escape.
Patrol boat	R-151	Cyprus Navy	Boghazi Squadron	Boghazi	1	The Leventis (pennant 15) was scuttled by her own crew at Chrysulis naval base, Boghazi.

=== 15 August ===
Type	Equipment	Owner	Unit	Location	Number Lost	Notes
Medium Tank	T-34/85	Cyprus National Guard	23 ΕΜΑ (attached to 341 Battalion)	Famagusta	3	At 14:00 the Greek-Cypriot 341st contacted Turkish tanks and the Turkish 14th Infantry Regiment. Realizing it was abandoned and isolated, the command of the 341st ordered retreat at 17:00, covered by the T-34 tanks. The T-34 tanks, were then abandoned, and their crews taken into custody by the UN staff at Famagusta.
Artillery	Six-Pounder	Cyprus National Guard	341 Battalion	Famagusta	6	Abandoned at 17.00hrs after the defences of Famagusta collapse.
Main Battle Tank	M47	Turkish Army	28th Divisional Tank Battalion	Lapithos	1	One M47 tank was captured intact during an ambush by the 231 Battalion near Lapithos. The tank was used to shell the enemy, but could not be recovered and was consequently destroyed by its Greek Cypriot crew.

=== 16 August ===
Type	Equipment	Owner	Unit	Location	Number Lost	Notes
Main Battle Tank	M47 / M48	Turkish Army	28 Divisional Tank Battalion	Nicosia	5	A total of five Turkish main battle tanks were lost in action during the assault on the Greek ELDYK camp in western Nicosia. Four vehicles were hit by light anti-tank weapons, and a fifth was destroyed by an artillery strike.
Main Battle Tank	M47	Turkish Army	Unknown	Nicosia	1	A single M47 tank was lost in action during an engagement with dug-in T-34s in the north of Nicosia in the afternoon.

== See also ==
- Military operations during the Invasion of Cyprus (1974)
- Cypriot National Guard
- Cyprus Navy and Marine Police
- List of equipment of the Cypriot National Guard
- Cyprus dispute
- List of massacres in Cyprus
- Turkish war crimes
