= USS Harwood =

Gearing-class destroyer

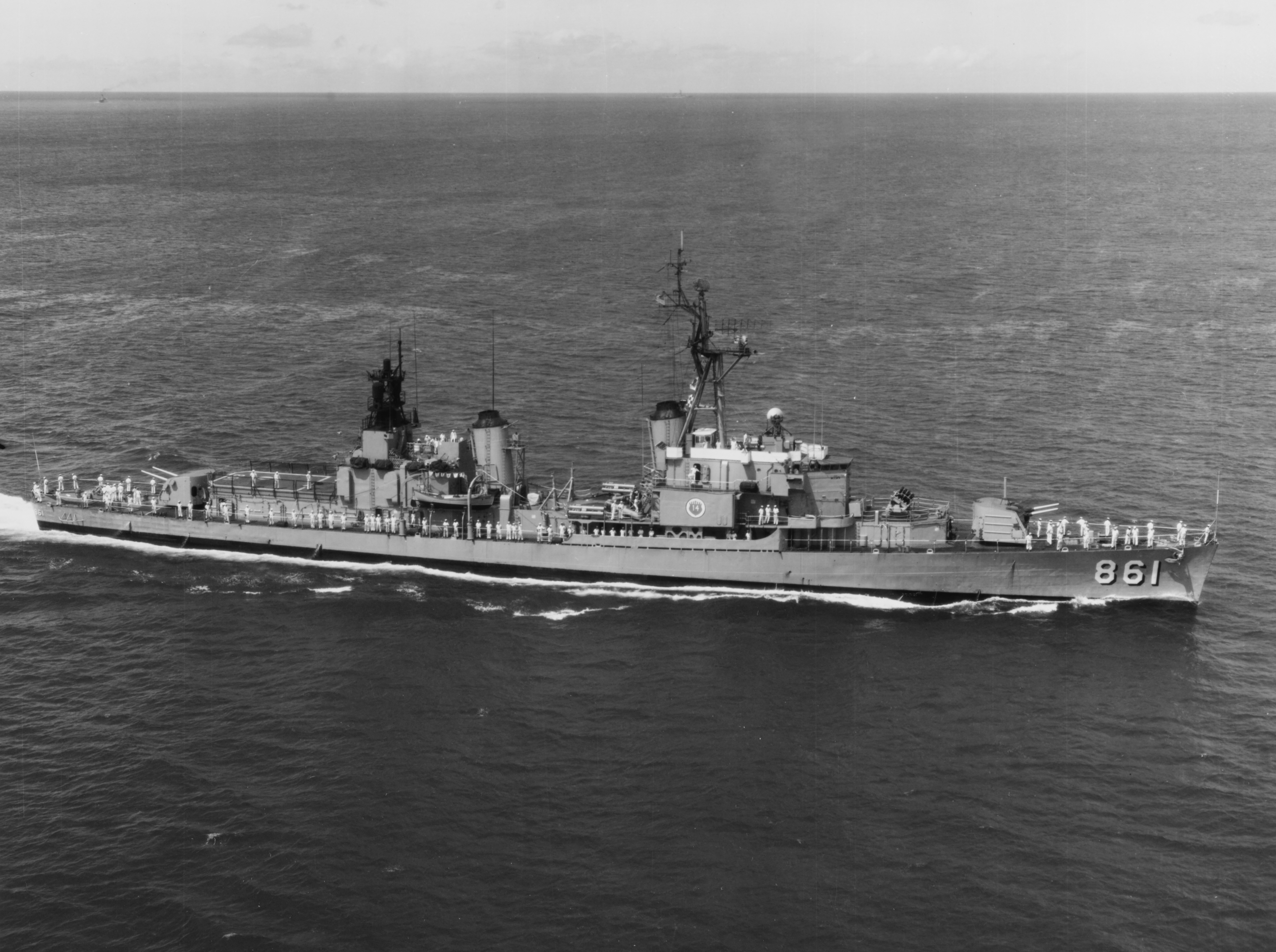
- USS Harwood after FRAM II

History

United States
- Name: USS Harwood
- Builder: Bethlehem Shipbuilding, San Pedro, California
- Laid down: 29 October 1944
- Launched: 22 May 1945
- Commissioned: 28 September 1945
- Stricken: 1 February 1973
- Identification: Callsign: NBFN; Hull number: DD-861
- Fate: Sold to Turkey, 17 December 1971

Turkey
- Name: TCG Kocatepe
- Acquired: 17 December 1971
- Identification: D 354
- Fate: Sunk in error by Turkish aircraft, 21 July 1974

General characteristics
- Class & type: Gearing-class destroyer
- Displacement: 3,460 long tons (3,516 t) full
- Length: 390 ft 6 in (119.02 m)
- Beam: 40 ft 10 in (12.45 m)
- Draft: 14 ft 4 in (4.37 m)
- Propulsion: General Electric geared turbines, 2 shafts, 60,000 shp (44,742 kW)
- Speed: 36.8 knots (68.2 km/h; 42.3 mph)
- Range: 4,500 nmi (8,300 km) at 20 kn (37 km/h; 23 mph)
- Complement: 336 (1945), 247 (After FRAM II overhaul)
- Armament: (Initial): 6 × 5"/38 caliber guns; 12 × 40 mm AA guns; 11 × 20 mm AA guns; 10 × 21-inch (530 mm) torpedo tubes; 6 × depth charge projectors; 2 × depth charge tracks; (After FRAM II overhaul): 4 × 5"/38 caliber guns; 1 × Hedgehog (weapon) in Mark 15 mount; 2 x 3 Mark 46 torpedoes in Mark 32 Surface Vessel Torpedo Tubes; 1 x Gyrodyne QH-50 DASH (intended but not installed)

USS Harwood (DD/DDE-861) was a Gearing-class destroyer of the United States Navy, in service from 1945 to 1971. She was transferred to Turkey on 17 December 1971 and sunk after being erroneously bombed by Turkish aircraft on 21 July 1974.

== Namesake ==
Bruce Lawrence Harwood was born 10 February 1910 at Claremont, California. He enlisted in the Navy on 6 June 1935. After training as an aviation cadet at Naval Air Station Pensacola, Florida, he was commissioned Ensign on 7 July 1939 and began flying duty with a torpedo plane squadron. He received the Navy Cross for extraordinary heroism on 24 August 1942 during the Solomon Islands campaign. Leading his squadron in an unsupported aerial torpedo raid against an Imperial Japanese Navy (IJN) task force, Lieutenant Harwood pressed home the attack through antiaircraft fire. The squadron scored one certain and two estimated hits on an enemy aircraft carrier. He was awarded the Gold Star in lieu of a second Navy Cross for heroism as squadron commander 20 September-5 October 1942. Leading an attack group of bombers through adverse flying conditions, he located a force of IJN destroyers landing troops and supplies on Guadalcanal. Despite violent maneuvering by the IJN ships, he and his men scored at least one and probably more hits. On 4 October he led another attack group of torpedo planes against an IJN light cruiser and three destroyers. In spite of bad visibility and heavy AA fire, he pressed home the attack, scoring two positive and one possible hit on the cruiser. The following night he and his bombers flying on instruments through a violent tropical storm to Rekata Bay, bombed shore installations there despite fierce opposition from Japanese fighter planes which swarmed to the attack. Appointed Commander on 1 July 1944, he was killed 24 October 1944 when the USS Princeton received bomb hits which triggered a series of fatal explosions. While serving as air officer on the Princeton, he had received another Gold Star in lieu of a third Navy Cross.

== Construction and commissioning ==
Harwood was laid down by the Bethlehem Shipbuilding at San Pedro in California on 29 October 1944, launched on 22 May 1945, by Mrs. Bruce Lawrence Harwood, widow of Commander Harwood and commissioned on 28 September 1945.

=== Operational history ===
==== 1945–1971 ====
After shakedown along the California coast, Harwood joined the United States Seventh Fleet in Chinese waters. In addition to aiding in the occupation of Japan, the destroyer also participated in fleet and anti-submarine (ASW) exercises before returning to San Diego 21 February 1947. Harwood entered the Mare Island Naval Shipyard after a second Western Pacific cruise in January 1949 to be equipped with the latest antisubmarine equipment. Redesignated DDE-861 on 4 March 1950, the escort destroyer reported to her new home port, Naval Station Newport, Rhode Island, on 11 September 1949 to participate in research on cold weather ASW operations as well as fleet and training exercises. Departing Norfolk in late August, Harwood made her first Mediterranean cruise with the United States Sixth Fleet and returned to the United States 10 November 1950.

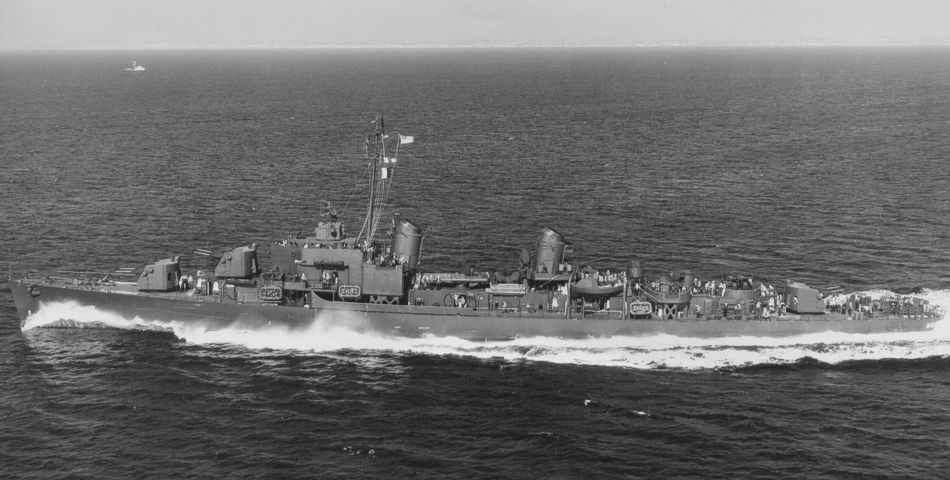
Harwood in October 1945.

Subsequent years fell into a pattern for Harwood as she engaged in varied training maneuvers and made yearly cruises to the Mediterranean. Harwood sailed 4 January 1957 for a 3-month ASW demonstration which took her along the South American coast to Colombia, Ecuador, Peru, Chile, Panama and Cuba. Entering the New York Naval Shipyard on 2 May 1961, Harwood underwent a Fleet Rehabilitation and Modernization (FRAM II) overhaul. Her bridge was totally reconstructed, new types of torpedo tubes were installed, and the 76 mm antiaircraft guns were removed to accommodate a hangar and launching deck for Gyrodyne QH-50 DASH anti-submarine drones. Departing the yard 2 February 1962, Harwood sailed to her home port, Naval Station Mayport, Florida, and from there to the Caribbean Sea. When the Cuban Missile Crisis erupted in October 1962, Harwood and sailed with 4 hours' notice to join the blockading fleet "quarantining" Cuba. She returned to Mayport on 2 November 1962 and was redesignated DD-861 on 1 July 1963.

Harwood sailed for the Mediterranean on 6 August 1963 and provided ASW service during exercise "Riptide IV" en route. She transited the Straits of Gibraltar on the 22d for intense periods of anti-aircraft, anti-submarine, and binary chemical weapon exercises in the Mediterranean Sea. Returning home 23 December, the destroyer operated along the East Coast of the United States until getting under way 31 March 1964 for a brief visit to Brazil. She arrived at Annapolis, Maryland on 1 June, embarked midshipmen, and sailed for Europe. She visited Norway, Belgium, France, and the United Kingdom before debarking the "Middies" at Naval Station Norfolk.

In April 1965, she began overhaul and alterations at the Norfolk Naval Shipyard. On 22 August she returned to Mayport en route to Guantanamo Bay Naval Base, Cuba, for refresher training. She operated along the coast of the United States' southern states until departing Mayport on 22 July 1966 for the Mediterranean deployment. On this tour she transited the Suez Canal and visited Aden and Kenya before rejoining the 6th Fleet in the Medediterranean Sea on 2 November 1965.

Harwood returned home 17 December. She operated out of Newport, off the New England coast until sailing for her 10th Mediterranean deployment 29 June 1967. Reaching Naval Station Rota, Spain on 10 July, Harwood soon joined the 6th Fleet, an element of stability in the ancient and volatile sea which had so recently been churned by the Six-Day War.

Harwood continued alternated operations along the East Coast of the United States and in the Caribbean Sea with the 2nd Fleet with deployments to the Mediterranean Sea until being decommissioned and stricken from the Naval Vessel Register on 1 February 1973 after her transfer to the Turkish Navy on 17 December 1971.

==== 1971–1974 ====
Harwood was transferred to the Turkish Navy on 17 December 1971, and renamed TCG Kocatepe (D 354). The ship was bombed and sunk in error by Turkish Lockheed F-104 Starfighter and North American F-100 Super Sabre aircraft on 21 July 1974, mistaking it for a Greek vessel during Turkish landings on Cyprus. Fifty-four members of her crew were killed in the incident.

== Bibliography ==
- Morison, Samuel Loring (1988). "Question 35/87". Warship International. XXV (3): 317–318. ISSN 0043-0374.
