= Max Reisch =

Austrian long-distance travelling pioneer, researcher and orientalist

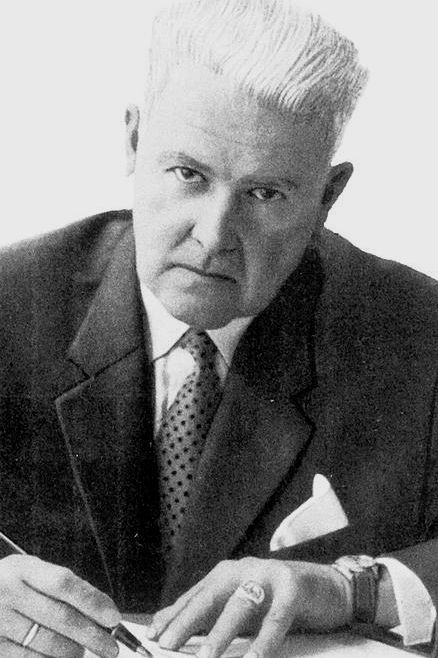
- Max Reisch portrait ca. 1960
- Born: October 8, 1912; Kufstein, Austria
- Died: January 18, 1985 (aged 72)
- Occupation(s): Travelling pioneer, researcher, author

Max Reisch (1912–1985) was an Austrian long-distance traveler, author, researcher and orientalist who in 1933 made the first overland journey by motorcycle to India (from Europe), and who in 1935/1936 was the first to circumnavigate the world by traversing Mainland Southeast Asia in a car.

== Life, work and accomplishments ==
Max Reisch attended primary and secondary schools in Bozen and Kufstein 1918 – 1924, then finished the HTL Mödling, and was graduated as "Ingenieur" (Austrian title) in Building construction 1931. Afterwards he studied at the former "Hochschule für Welthandel" Vienna (Master as "Diplom-Kaufmann" 1937, then 1939 Doctorate).

He got famous as travel pioneer and long-distance traveler by undertaking expeditions to North Africa, the Near and Middle East, including Palestine, Syria, Iran, Irak, Kuwait, Saudi Arabia, Afghanistan and British India. Further he drove as pioneer by car into the Far East, crossing Mainland Southeast Asia for the first time ever, going as far as China and subsequently via Japan and the USA around the world. These travels were performed using expanded serial Puch Motorcycles (models 175 and 250), a modified Steyr 100 car, and the first European Motorhome, invented and designed by Max Reisch himself. He also was a pioneer for Rotel Tours and planned or directed travels to the Holy Land, travels via Afghanistan to Pakistan, or Sahara-travels in Algeria (see below).

=== Travels and Expeditions (a selection) ===
- 1930: Solo Motorcycle journey crossing over 12 Alpine passes with a Puch type 175; f. e. over the Stelvio Pass.;
- 1931: Solo Motorcycle journey to and around the Lake Garda;
- 1932: North Africa/Sahara-Motorcycle journey (with Alfred Schricker), using a modified Puch motorbike Type 250; the two being the first Austrians to travel into the Sahara with a motorbike.;
- 1933: India-Motorcycle-Expedition (together with Herbert Tichy, using an original Puch 250, augmented with special equipment designed by Reisch himself), travelling the Balkans, Anatolia, the Syrian Desert and the Iran to the Indian subcontinent as far as Mumbai. Reisch and Tichy were the first motorbikers worldwide to reach India on an overland route coming from Europe.

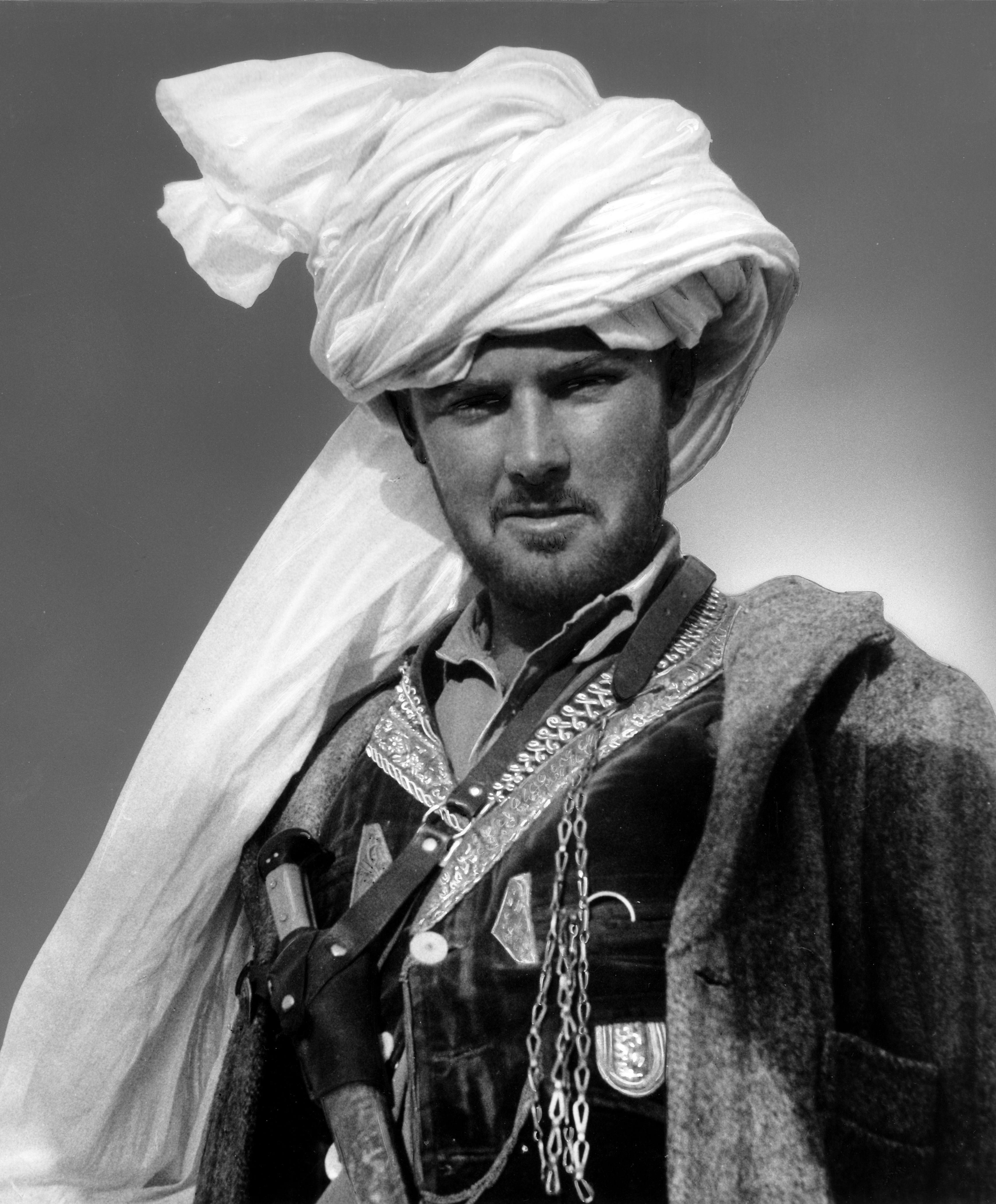
Max Reisch 1935 in Afghanistan

- 1935/1936: circumnavigation of the earth by car (with Helmuth Hahmann) Reisch was using a Steyr 100 chassis, then designed and expanded for this expedition by Max Reisch himself. Reisch and Hahmann were the first to traverse Mainland Southeast Asia: (Myanmar, Thailand, French Indochina i. e. Laos, and Vietnam to China) by car, and completing the circumnavigation of the earth via Japan and the USA back to Austria.
- 1942/1943: as military officer at the German Afrikakorps under General Erwin Rommel: desert trips in Tunesia, Libya und Egypt, f. e. to the Siwa Oasis.
- 1952: Arabian Peninsula-Journey (with Rolf Hecker), using the first European motorhome, designed by Max Reisch himself. This expedition via the Near East crossed the Irak and Kuwait, and reached also Saudi Arabia with its capital Riyadh, including a meeting with king Ibn Saud).
- 1955/1956: Journey to the Sinai Peninsula and the deserts of Egypt along the Red Sea and the Mediterranean Sea (with his wife Christiane Reisch), using an Opel-Caravan (1954), but with a special Roof tent designed under the supervision of Max Reisch (the vehicle was called the "Sinai-Moses".
- 1958: Journey "On the traces of Alexander the Great", via Lebanon, the Iran and Afghanistan as far as Pakistan, again using the above-mentioned "Sinai-Moses", and with his wife Christane Reisch.
- 1961: Journey "On the Traces of the First Crusade (1096-1099)" to the Holy Land, including trips to Petra, and the coast of the Red Sea in contemporary Jordania, accomplished with a Ford Taunus and an early Caravan by the German company Knaus-Tabbert, again with his wife Christiane Reisch.
- 1962: First group-travel (as concept-creator and tour guide) for Rotel Tours to India via Iran and Afghanistan; repeated several times until 1976.
- 1969: First group-travel (as concept creator) for Rotel Tours, route "Trans-Sahara": from Tunis to Tamanrasset, and further to Agadez, Niamey, Porto-Novo, and Accra, repeated several times until 1980.
- 1972 – 1981: Group-travels (as concept creator and occasional tour guide) for Rotel Tours, tours in South Africa, Scandinavia, Iceland, Indonesia and South America (there from the Andes to the Amazon rainforest).

=== Other activities ===
Together with his elder brother Hans F. Reisch (1907–2004) he founded 1946 the Spar (retailer) Austrian branch in Kufstein, and was an executive officer there till 1955.

In 1950 Max Reisch was a Central European Rally Champion and thus the first Tyrolian to win this trophy.

For his work Max Reisch was honoured by Austrian public institutions several times

- 1954 Grand Gold Medal, Austrian Motor Club;
- 1971 Honorary Title "Professor" by the President of Austria;
- 1978 Grand Silver Medal, City of Vienna;
- 1982 Golden Cross of Merit, Federal State of Tyrol;
- 1984 Golden Badge of Honour for Cultural Merits, city of Kufstein.

== Publications (a selection) ==
=== Books ===
- Transasien (title English "Transasia"). Brockhaus publishers, Leipzig 1939 (about the Transasia-trip Vienna to Shanghai 1935; in German).
- Transasia. Blix forlag/ publishers, Oslo 1944 (= "Transasien" 1939, translation into Norwegian).
- Indien – lockende Ferne (title English "India – the alluring distance"). Ullstein Verlag publishers, Vienna et al. 1949 (about the India-motorcycle-trip 1933 with Herbert Tichy, in German).
- 2 Mann und 32 PS (title English "2 men and 32 HP"). Ullstein publishers, Vienna et al. 1951 (on the Transasia-trip 1935 and its continuation as world-circumference 1936 via Japan and the USA, in German).
- Im Auto nach Koweit (title English "By car to Kuwait"). Ullstein publishers, Vienna et al. 1953 (first report about the Arabia-trip 1952, in German).
- König im Morgenland (title English "King of the Orient"). Ullstein publishers, Vienna et al. 1954 (second report about the Arabia-trip 1952, in German).
- Till Kuwait. Natur och Kultur publishers, Stockholm 1955 (= "Im Auto nach Koweit" 1953, translated into Swedish).
- Auf nach Afrika! (with Christiane Reisch; title English "On to Africa!"). Ullstein publishers, Vienna et al. 1957 (report about the Sahara-expedition 1952, in German).
- Tapis Volants et Pipelines (title English "Flying carpets and Pipelines"). Calmann-Levy publishers, Paris 1957 (= "König im Morgenland" 1954, in French).
- Siwa – Sinai und Sid (title English "Siwa, Sinai and Sid"). Kümmerly+Frey publishers, Bern 1958 (report on the Egypt- and Sahara-trip 1955/1956, in German).
- Mausefalle Afrika: Meine Wüstenfahrten bei Rommel, und wie wir aus Tunis entwischt sind (title English "Rat-trap Africa: desert travels with Rommel, and how we escaped from Tunis"). K. Vowinckel publishers, Neckargemünd 1962 (report on travels as part of the Afrika Korps 1941–1943, in German).
- Strasse der Zehntausend: Auf den Spuren Alexanders des Großen (title English "Street of the 10.000 – on the tracks of Alexander the Great"). Österreichischer Bundesverlag publishers, Vienna 1962 (report on a trip in the Near and Middle East to Pakistan 1958, in German).
- Die Straße des Glaubens: Auf den Spuren der Kreuzritter (title English "Street of Faith – on the tracks of the Crusades"). Österreichischer Bundesverlag publishers, Vienna 1965 (report on a Palestine (region)-trip 1961, in German).
- (editor) Karawanenstraßen Asiens (title English "Caravan Routes of Asia"). Welsermühl publishers, Wels 1974 (Illustrated book, based on several trips of Max Reisch and his fotos in the Near and Middle East, augmented by additional fotos by other authors, in German).
- Indien lockende Ferne: 13.000 km Pionierfahrt nach Indien (title English "India – the alluring distance. 13.000 km pioneer-trip by a motorbike to India"). Ennsthaler publishers, Steyr 1983, ISBN 3-85068-131-9 (augmented anniversary edition (50 years after the 1933 trip) of "Indien etc." 1949, see above, in German).
- Im Auto um die Erde: Pionierfahrt durch Burma, Thailand, Laos, Vietnam und China (title English "By Car around the World. A pioneering trip via Burma, Thailand, Laos, Vietnam and China"), Ennsthaler publishers, Steyr 1984, ISBN 3-85068-176-9 (augmented new edition of "2 Mann und 32 PS" 1951, see above).
- Out of the Rat Trap. Desert Adventures with Rommel. The History Press, Stroud/ UK 2013: ISBN 978-0-7524-9007-6 (= "Mausefalle Afrika" 1962, see above, translated into English by Allison Falls, edited by Peter Reisch, but augmented with some additional colour fotos).
- An Incredible Journey. The lost world of the 1930s circled by two men in one small car. Veloce publishers, Poundbury/UK 2017, ISBN 978-1-78711-165-3 (= "Im Auto um die Erde" 1983, see above, translated into English by Allison Falls, edited by Peter Reisch).
- India. The Shimmering Dream, A captivating window to a forgotten world: to India by motorcycle in 1933. Veloce publishers, Poundbury/UK 2018, ISBN 978-1-78711-294-0 (= "Indien - Lockende Ferne“ 1983, see above, translated into English by Allison Falls, edited by Peter Reisch).

=== Articles ===
Between 1932 and 1984 Max Reisch published more than 700 contributions in Austrian, German, Italian, Hungarian, Estonian, British, US-American, Indian and Afghan newspapers and magazines, as well as ca. 30 chapters in books edited by others. See here the detailed list in the "Max-Reisch-Biblio-, Media- und Webografie by Ingo Mörth" (section: articles).

=== Audio-, Video-, Audiovisual and Internet-Contributions ===
Max Reisch documented all his travels with photographs (since 1932 in B/W, since 1938 also in colour). There are also B/W 35 mm films, used during the 1935/1936 world circumnavigation, and B/W 16 mm films used for some travels afterwards.

He published between 1934 and 1984 more than 100 original Radio reports, and from 1961 onwards also ca. 10 original TV-contributions. In addition, after his death 1985 several TV-films were compiled, designed and broadcast using the existing foto- and film-material. See here the detailed list of audio-, video- and web-contributions in the "Max-Reisch-Biblio-, Media- und Webografie by Ingo Mörth" (section: Audio, Video and Web)

For recent and still active websites pertaining to Max Reisch see below (external links).

== The Max Reisch Collections ==
=== Max Reisch Archive ===
All manuscripts, private texts (i.e. extensive diaries), all proofs and specimen copies of published texts by Max Reisch, and all photographic and film materials and documents are held by the private Max Reisch Archive, now in Innsbruck (maintained by son Peter Reisch), accessible only on request

=== Collection of Vehicles ===
The special motorcycles, automobiles, motorhomes and camping constructions, which were used for his travels, were preserved by Max Reisch, and can now be visited in the "Crosspoint Top Mountain Motorcycle Museum" in Obergurgl. Exhibited are f. e.:

- Stelvio Pass-Puch 175, used 1930, construction year (c.y.) 1925
- Lake Garda-Puch 175, used 1931, c.y. 1926
- Sahara-Puch 250, used 1932, c.y. 1929
- India-Puch 250, used 1933, c.y. 1933
- Transasia-Steyr 100-car, used 1935–1936, c.y. 1934.
- "Arabia-Sadigi": Gutbrod Atlas 800 based motorhome, used 1952, c.y. 1950.
- "Sinai-Moses": Opel Olympia Caravan with a special Roof tent, used 1955–1958, c.y. 1955.

=== Asiatika collection and "Orient-Archive" ===
The exhibition at the Crosspoint Museum Timmelsjoch contains also the so-called "Orient-Archive" of Max Reisch, comprising his extensive library of travel books and of abundant literature on countries he traveled, but also many objects of Asian art Max Reisch collected during his travels.

== Sources ==
- besides the many books and publications by Max Reisch himself (see above) there are to be noticed, too:
- Horst Christoph: Max Reisch – Über alle Straßen hinaus. (title English "Max Reisch – beyond all Streets" = a biography of Max Reisch, in German), Tyrolia editors, Innsbruck 2012, ISBN 978-3-7022-3212-2.
- Martin Stubreiter: Ein Tiroler für die Welt. Die Expeditionen des Max Reisch. (title English: "A Tyrolian for the World. On the Expeditions of Max Reisch", in German) In: Autorevue, ISSN 1017-8457, vol. 40 2013, no. 12 (December 2013), pp. 116–120.
- Peter Urbanek: Max Reisch: Wenn einer eine Reise tut. (title English: "Max Reisch – if somebody is travelling …", in German) In: Der Standard, ISSN 1560-6155, vol 31 2018, no. 342 (December 10, 2018; motor supplement), pp. 3–4.
- Jörg Christian Steiner: Professor Dr. Max Reisch. In: the same: ... unter fremden Sternen. Geschichten vom Leben geschrieben, ausgewählt und recherchiert (title English: "... under distant stars. Stories told, selected and researched by life", in German). Vienna 2022: Fegerl self-published, ISBN 978-3-901215-13-1, pp. 105–113.
- Alexander W. Trimmel: Jack of all Trades: Dr. Max Reisch. In: Rare & Unique Vehicles, ISSN 2709-8303, vol. 3 2023, no. 12 (December 2023): Special Theme „Globetrotters“), titlepage (foto), pp. 60–69.
