= Steyr 50 =

Steyr 50, 55
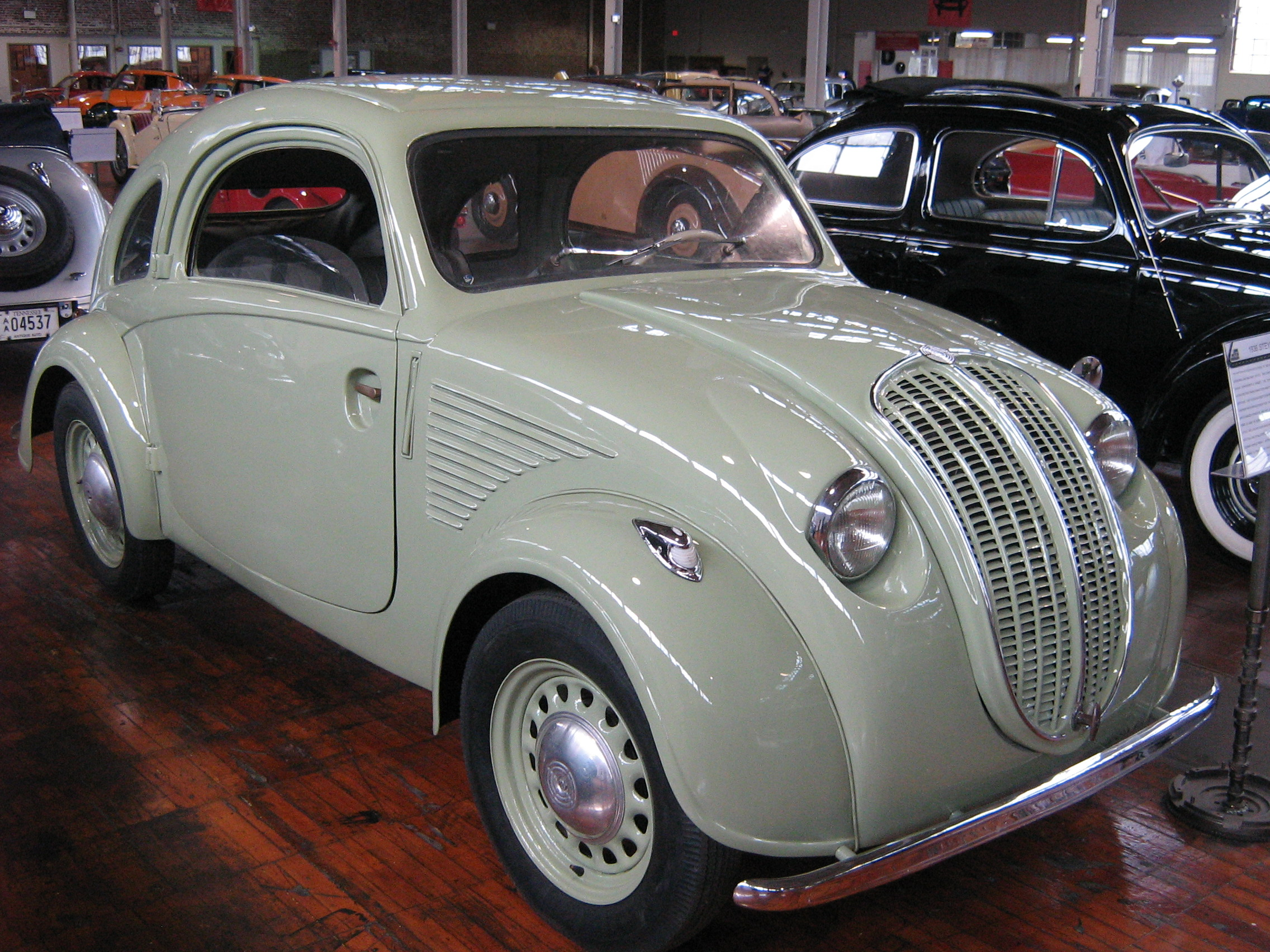
- 1936 Steyr 50

Overview
- Manufacturer: Steyr-Daimler-Puch AG
- Also called: "Steyr-Baby"
- Production: 1936–1940: 13,000 built
- Assembly: Steyr

Body and chassis
- Class: Subcompact, economy car
- Body style: 2-door sedan
- Layout: Front-engine, rear-wheel-drive

Powertrain
- Engine: Flat-four engine 16,2 kW (22 hp)
- Transmission: 4-speed manual

Dimensions
- Wheelbase: 2,250 mm (88.6 in)
- Length: 3,610–3,670 mm (142.1–144.5 in)
- Width: 1,520–1,530 mm (59.8–60.2 in)
- Curb weight: 750–815 kg (1,650–1,800 lb)

The Steyr 50 is a small car released in 1936 by the Austrian automobile manufacturer Steyr-Daimler-Puch AG.

== Design ==
The streamlined body was approved by Director Karl Jenschke to be constructed in 1935, however, in November of that same year Jenschke was employed as chief designer by the German Adler manufacturer in Frankfurt/Main. It was officially presented to the public at the 1936 Berlin Motor Show.

The car had a water-cooled four-cylinder boxer engine with thermosiphon cooling, driving the rear wheels through a four-speed transmission. To save room and weight, a dynastarter was used, which doubled as the axle of the radiator fan. It was regarded as the "Austrian Volkswagen" and was affectionately referred to as Steyr "Baby". The Volkswagen constructor Ferdinand Porsche had, despite rumors, not been involved in the design or production of the 50, nor was Hans Ledwinka, who had designed the Tatra V570. The little Steyr offered better seating and luggage space than Porsche's Volkswagen with shorter overall length, a large sheet metal sliding roof, and hydraulic brakes (instead of the early Volkswagens' cable-operated ones).

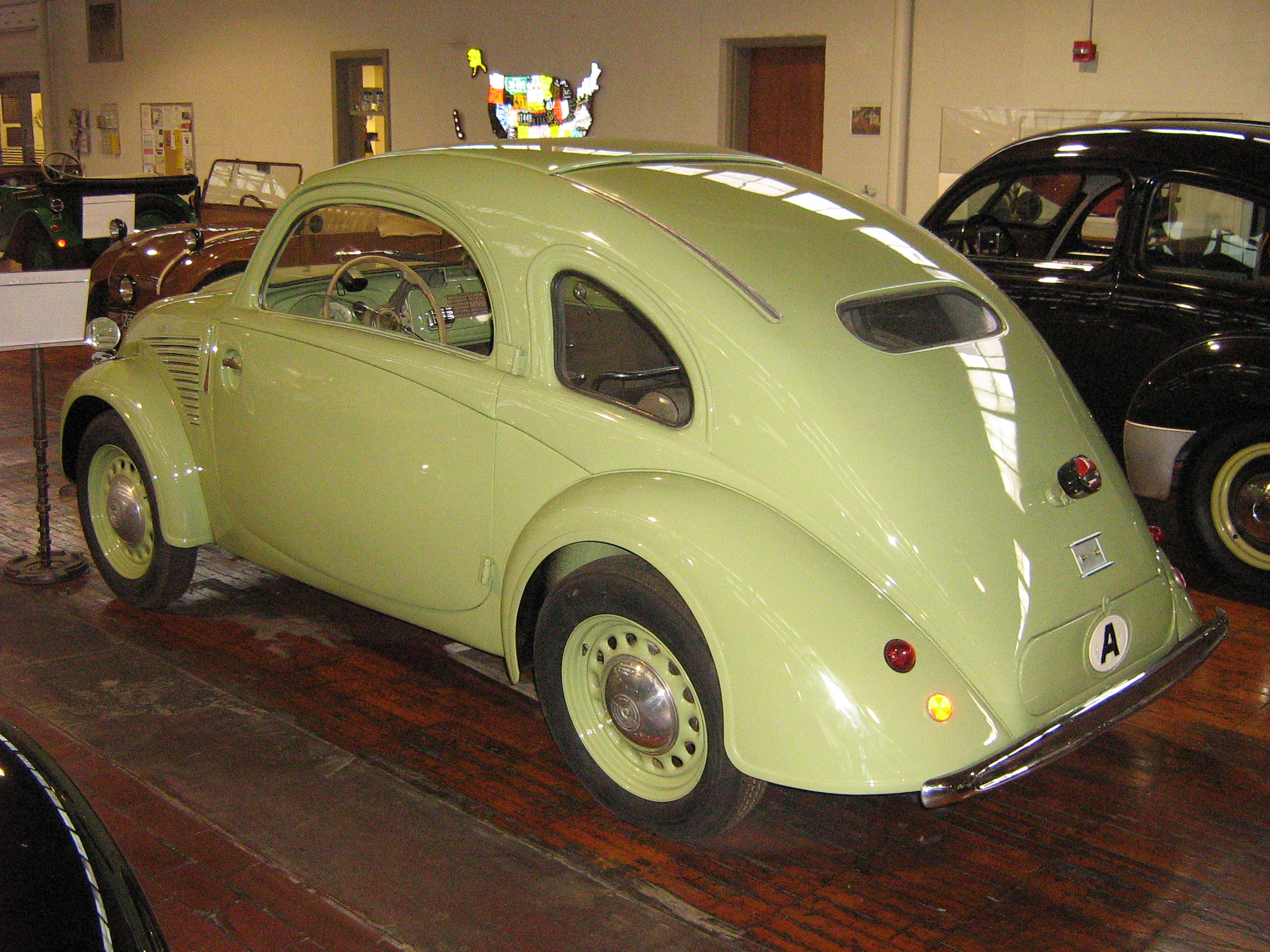
Left rear of the Steyr 50 'Baby' (Lane Motor Museum)

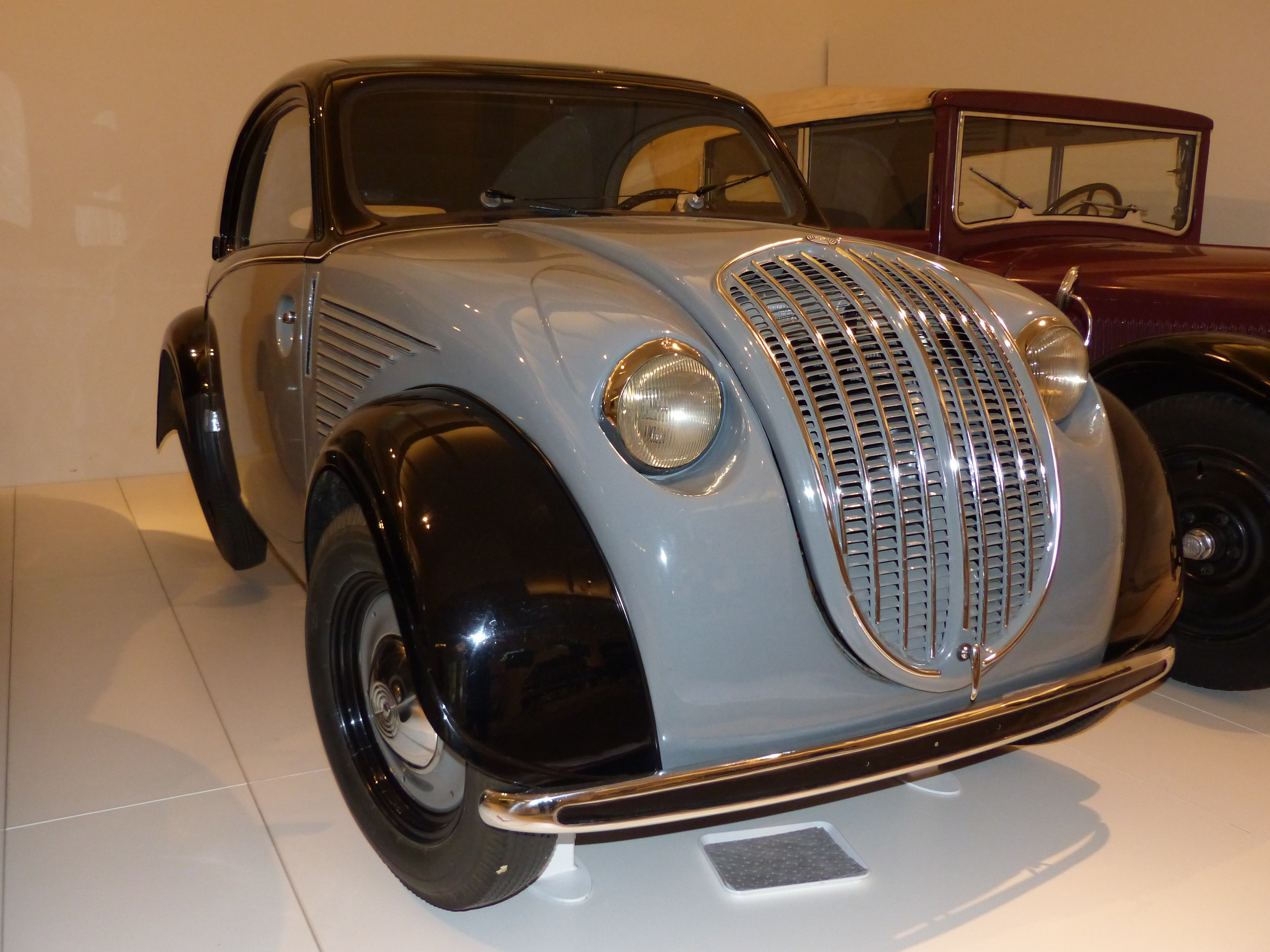
1938 Steyr 55 on display at the Technical Museum Vienna

In early 1938, the car was revised. It got a more powerful engine and a longer wheelbase. The new model was called the Steyr 55 and went on sale until production ceased in 1940.

A total of 13,000 "Steyr-Babys" were sold.

Year	1936	1937	1938	1939	1940	Sum
Steyr 50	3.410	1.790	1.300			6.500
Steyr 55			1.493	3.449	1.558	6.500

Other Steyr models included the Steyr 100 and Steyr 120, both equipped with straight-4 engines, as well as the flagship Steyr 220 with a 2.2 litre straight-6 producing 55 hp (41 kW; 56 PS). All these models were produced as cabriolets as well. The production of Steyr cars was discontinued during World War II, after bombing of the facilities in Steyr.

After the war, the factory was rebuilt and from 1953 specialized in the Austrian versions of the Fiat 1400 and 1900 models (Steyr 2000). Starting in 1957, the company also produced the Puch 500, based on the Fiat 500. Today the Steyr factory produces the BMW X models for Europe.
