= Steyr automobile =

Austrian automotive brand (1915–1959)

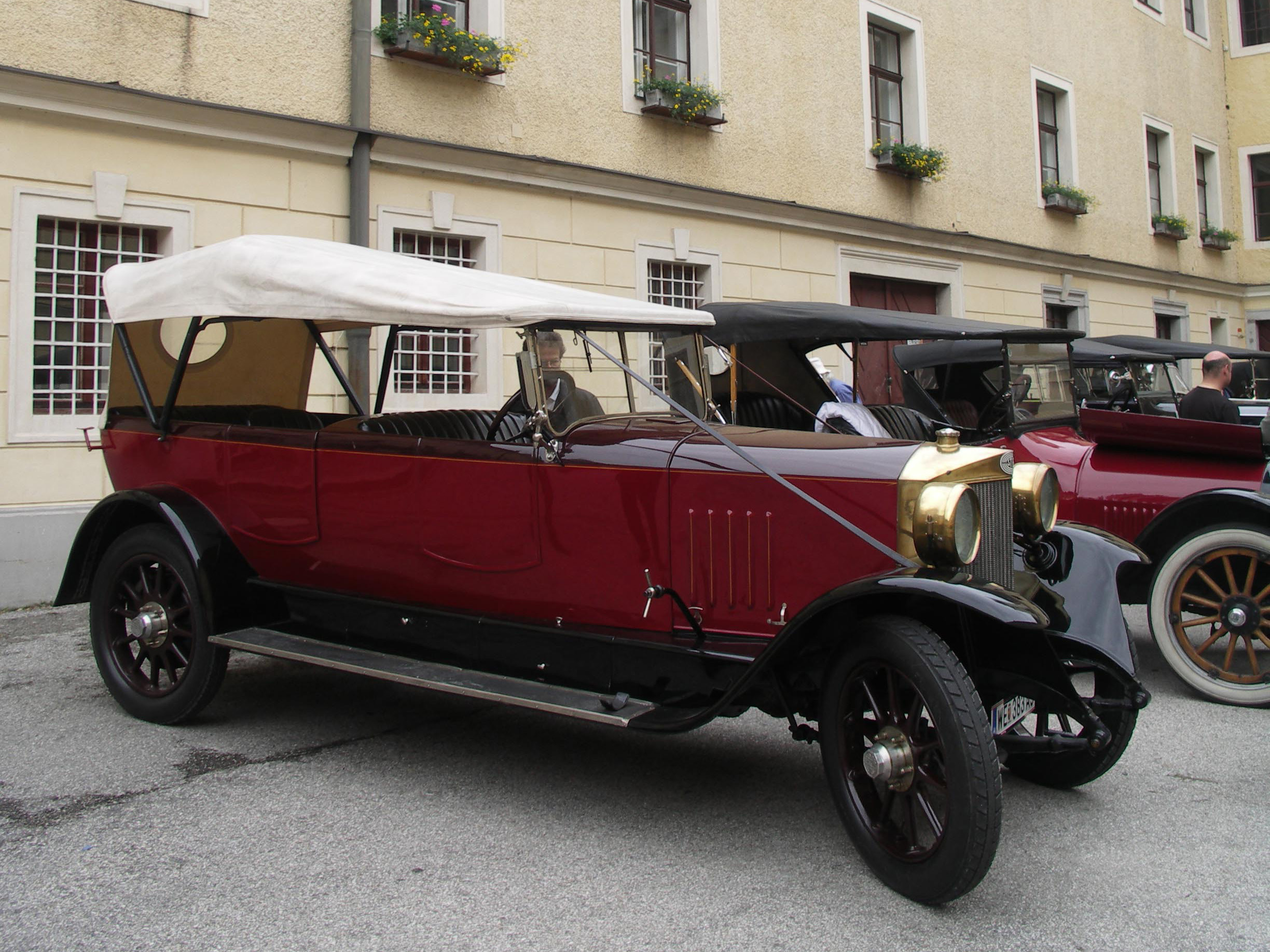
1926 Steyr VII

Steyr was an Austrian automotive brand, established in 1915 as a branch of the Österreichische Waffenfabriks-Gesellschaft (ÖWG) weapon manufacturing company. Renamed Steyr-Werke AG in 1926 and merged with Austro-Daimler and Puch into Steyr-Daimler-Puch AG, it continued manufacturing Steyr automobiles until 1959.

== History ==
The ÖWG stock company was founded in 1864 at Steyr in Upper Austria; in 1894 it had already issued a licence from the British Swift Company to manufacture bicycles under the trade-mark name Waffenrad. In order to further diversify manufacturing, the members of the executive board resolved upon fabricating Steyr automobiles and tractors. They hired 38-year-old designer Hans Ledwinka after he resigned from Nesselsdorfer-Wagenbau. Ledwinka developed Steyr's new six-cylinder car and supervised hiring engineers and mechanics.

This, the 12/40PS, featured the fashionable Spitzkühler (pointed radiator) of the prewar Mercedes and had very modern features: a 3255 cc (199ci) engine with SOHC, ball bearing-mounted crankshaft, four-speed gearbox, and multi-plate clutch, but not including four-wheel brakes, though Ledwinka's designs had used them as early as 1909. The ability of the engine to rev led to 4014 cc (245ci) Type VI and 4890 cc (298ci) Type VI Klausen sport versions, and it was employed in a 2½ ton truck.

Ledwinka again came into conflict with management when the company wanted luxury cars and he preferred a cheap, simple car, the sidevalve four-cylinder Type IV. Steyr concentrated on luxury cars. Ledwinka did not give up, creating a car with an air-cooled flat-twin and backbone chassis. Management ignored him, and he quit to join Tatra, taking the design with him; it also inspired the early Volkswagen Type 1.

Steyr realized their mistake too late, but Ledwinka acted as consulting engineer, influencing the 1925 Type XII, with a 14/35 hp 1.5-liter OHC six, crankshaft ball bearings, four-wheel brakes, half-elliptic front springs, and swing axle IRS. It came in two models, a four- or five-seater tourer at £440 and a four-door saloon at £560. This was joined by a 3.3-liter Type VII interior drive limousine, a luxurious four-door that seated up to seven and cost £1000; it shared its 17.75 kW (23.8 hp) chassis with the five- to seven-place, £975 Coupe de Ville.

=== Steyr-Werke ===
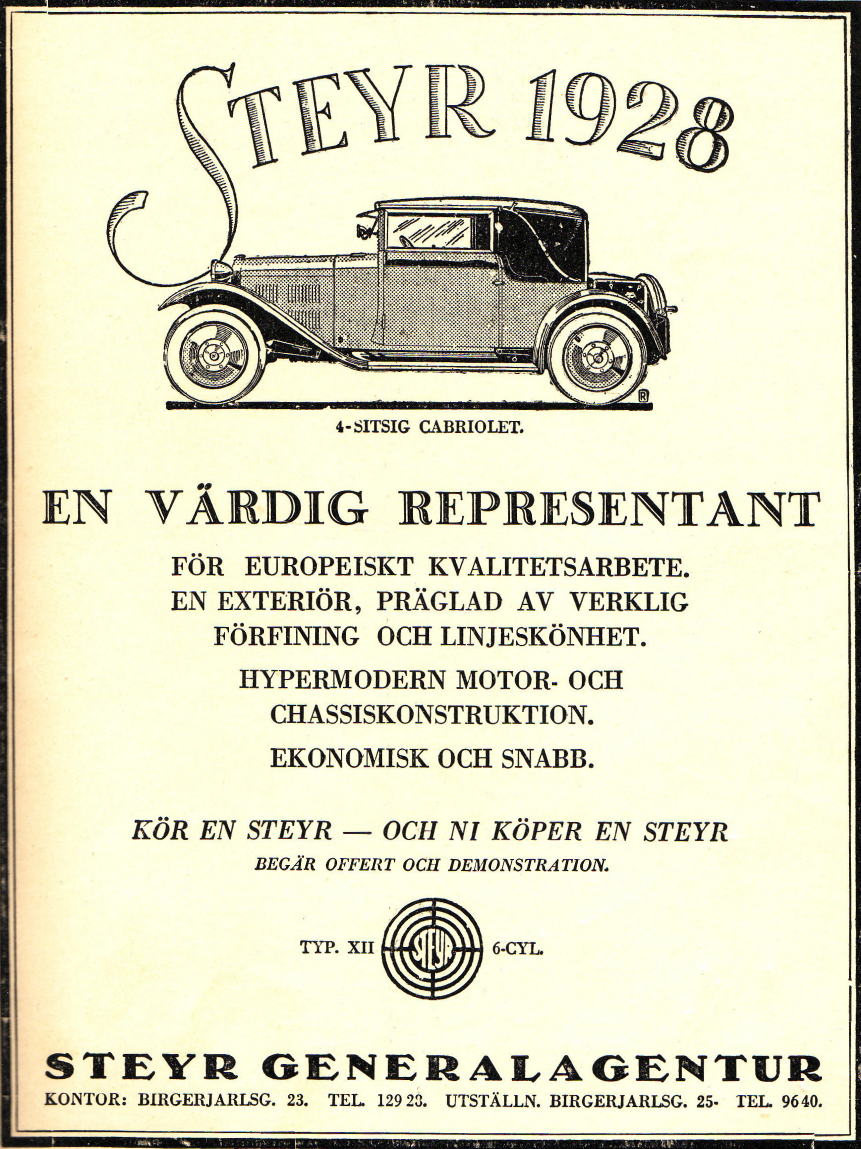
Swedish Ad for 1928 Steyr Type Xll 6cyl 4seat Convertible

The 1926 Olympia Motor Show premiered a new 10 kW (14 hp) tourer for £510. There was also another new small car in 1928, the 2060 cc (126ci) 16/40 hp Type XX and a 4-liter 29/70 hp six Type XVI, with vacuum servo-assisted brakes by Bosch-Dewandre.

In January 1929, Dr. Ferdinand Porsche joined Steyr from Mercedes. He quickly produced the 37/100 hp Austria, with a 5.3-liter straight eight, dual magneto ignition, and twin spark plugs, four-wheel Lockheed hydraulic servo-operated brakes, and Steyr's first detachable cylinder head. It also had Steyr's half-elliptic front suspension, independent rear suspension through transverse sprung swing axles and wire spoke wheels with quickly detachable racing type hubs. It was shown at the Paris Salon and Olympia, the cabriolet offered at £1550.

The Great Depression intervened, however, and Steyr was bailed out by Austro Daimler, which killed the project as competing with its own very similar car, while Porsche resigned to form Porsche Büro in Stuttgart. The crash hit hard. Steyr in 1929 produced short of 5000 cars and 1000 trucks in all, and in 1930, just twelve.

Aid turned to buyout in 1935, and in the interim Steyr relied on a Porsche design, the Type XXX. Its 2078 cc (127ci) six had plain bearings and pushrod valves. It was developed into the 2.3-liter 530 of 1936. Steyr also displayed the unconventional, with the 120 of 1934, with double transverse-leaf independent front suspension and streamlined body; they sold 1200 cars of this model, and improved it into the 2.3-liter 220 of 1937.

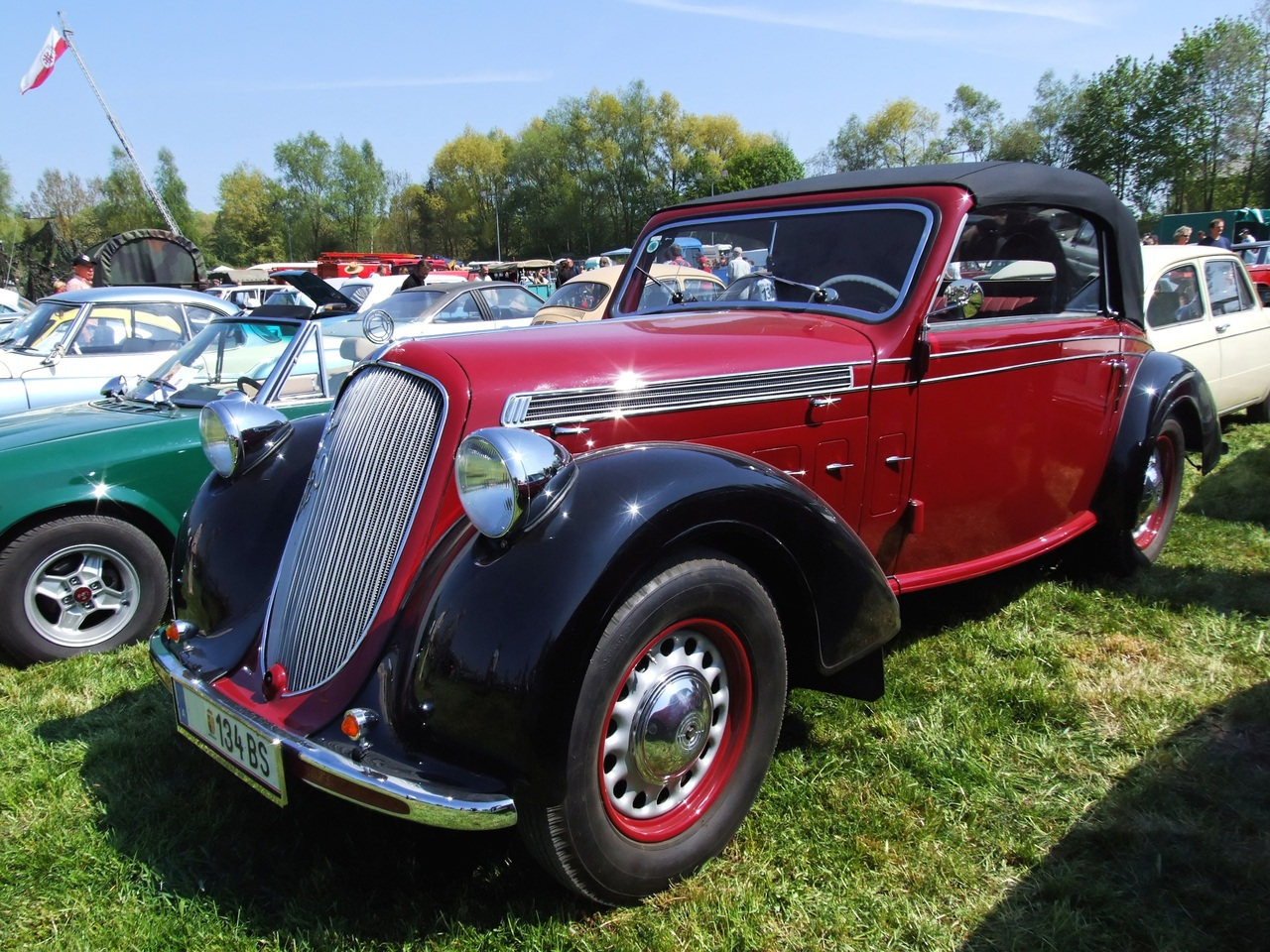
1939 Steyr 220

There were also licence-built Opel P4s (Steyr-Opel, nicknamed "Stopel") and, still in 1934, the Type 100, a less attractive, low-cost economy car, of exactly the type (if not the appearance) Ledwinka had advocated ten years before, with a 1.4-liter sidevalve four of 34 hp, but similar streamlined appearance as the 120. The Type 50 in 1936 was smaller and "surpassingly ugly" (which was a lot to surpass in that era), the child of a Chrysler Airflow, and as aerodynamically efficient as the contemporary VW; even so, the Kleinwagen was popular (as its Type 1 cousin would be a generation later), due to a rather roomy interior and a metal sliding roof. The bigger 1158 cc (71ci) 25 hp (19 kW) engine and new number, Type 55, of 1938 could still hardly push it past 80 km/h (50 mph), but even so, some 13,000 were built by end of production in 1940.

=== World War II and beyond ===
During the war, Steyr-Daimler-Puch built vehicles like the Raupenschlepper, Ost for the German Wehrmacht armed forces, and afterwards, modified Fiat automobiles for Austrian consumption, adding swing axles and, in some models, engines of their own design. These were the "Steyr-Fiat" 1100 Mod E, followed by the 1400, which from 1953 got an Austrian 2-liter engine, and was named Steyr 2000. The production of Steyr automobiles was finally terminated in 1959, when it was replaced by the Fiat 1800/2100 six-cylinder models.

From 1957 to 1973 the Puch 500 was built in the Graz plant with great success (almost 60,000 sold), using the Fiat 500 body but Steyr mechanics (to varying degrees - but always with the Austrian opposed twin engine); important versions were the 650 TR sports model and the 700 C microvan. From 1973 to 1975 some few Fiat 126 were equipped with the boxer twin engine for the Austrian market.

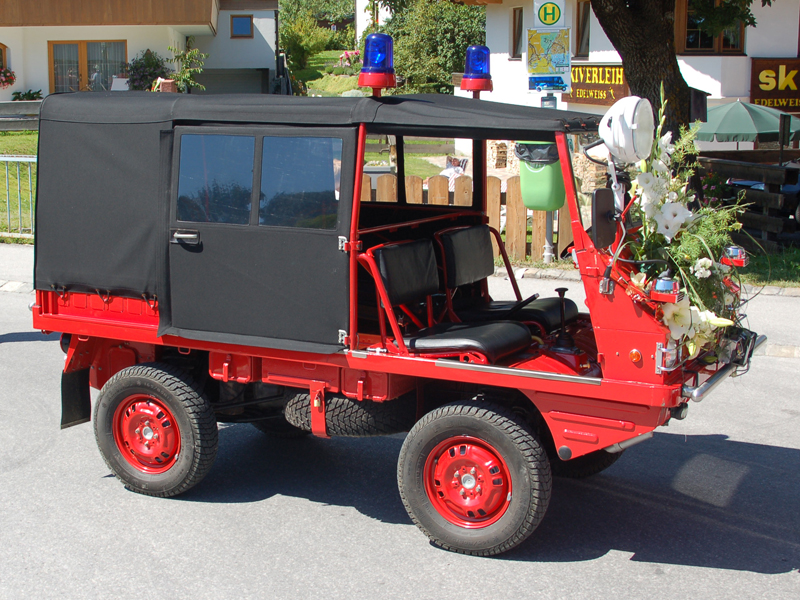
Haflinger

Steyr-Daimler-Puch continued manufacturing utility vehicles, introducing the remarkable Haflinger (named for a Tyrolian pony) four-wheel drive truck in 1959, "probably the most versatile off-road vehicle ever produced." Able to cross almost any terrain and scale mountains, they typically had only a two-cylinder air-cooled boxer 643 cc (39ci) engine of 20 kW (27 hp). The performance attracted military orders, and led to the much heavier and stronger 4x4/6x6 Pinzgauer (named after a cattle breed from Salzburg). From 1972 Steyr-Daimler-Puch collaborated with Mercedes in the design and manufacturing of the more comfortable, Puch G version of the Mercedes-Benz G-Class, built by Magna Steyr up to today.

== See also ==
- Steyr Mannlicher
- Steyr Motors
- Steyr Type XXX

== Sources ==
- Wise, David Burgess. "Steyr-Puch: The Legacy of the Ledwinkas", in Ward, Ian, executive editor. World of Automobiles (London: Orbis, 1974), Volume 19, p. 2193-6.
- Rauscher, Karl-Heinz und Knogler, Franz: Das Steyr-Baby und seine Verwandten, Weishaupt Verlag, A-8342 Gnas, 1. Auflage (2002), ISBN 3-7059-0102-8 ISBN 978-3705901025
