= Steyr 120 Super, Steyr 125 Super, Steyr 220 =

Steyr 120 Super, 125 Super, 220
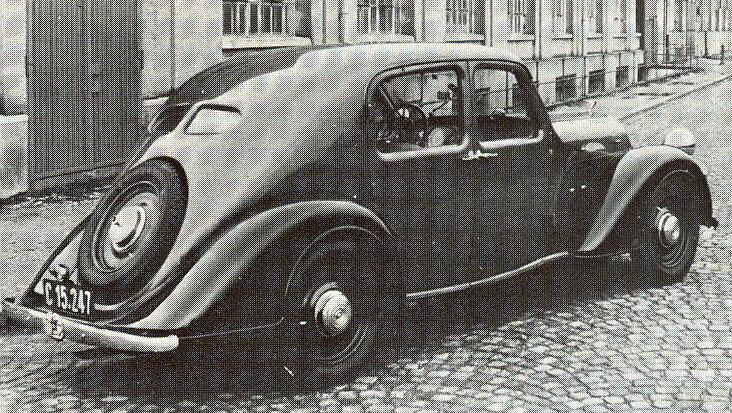
- Steyr 120 Super Sedan (1935)

Overview
- Manufacturer: Steyr-Daimler-Puch; Austria / Germany
- Production: 1935–36 (120); 1936–37 (125); 1937–41 (220)
- Assembly: Steyr-Puch

Body and chassis
- Body style: sedan convertible sports car
- Layout: FR layout

Powertrain
- Engine: Straight-6: 1,990 cc (120); 2,078 cc (125); 2,260 cc (220)
- Transmission: four-gear

Dimensions
- Wheelbase: 2,830 mm (111.4 in)
- Length: 4,570 mm (179.9 in)
- Width: 1,550 mm (61.0 in) (120), 1,650 mm (65.0 in) (125 and 220)
- Height: 1,570 mm (61.8 in) (120), 1,600 mm (63.0 in) (125 and 220)
- Curb weight: 1100 kg (120), 1200 kg (125), 1250 kg (220)

The Steyr 120 Super, Steyr 125 Super and Steyr 220 were a series of medium-sized cars built by the Austrian firm Steyr-Daimler-Puch from 1935 to 1941. The moderately streamlined body was designed by technical director Karl Jenschke (1899-1969) and was manufactured by Gläser-Karosserie GmbH in Dresden. The design had a close resemblance to the smaller Steyr 100.

== Steyr 120/125 Super ==
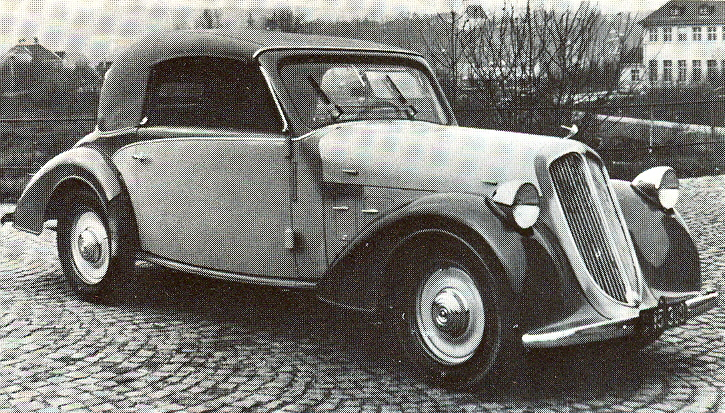
Steyr 120 Super Convertible (1935)

The 120 series cars were equipped with a six-cylinder in-line engine (as opposed to the four-cylinder Steyr 100) driving the rear wheels via a four-speed transmission. Front wheels had a transverse leaf spring suspension while the rear swing axle was mounted on quarter-elliptic leaf springs. On the four-door sedan model the rear doors were hinged at the back-end (known as suicide doors), allowing the B-pillar to be omitted. By 1936 a total of 1200 Steyr 120 Super had been produced.

The 1936 model changes included a wider axle track and a bigger engine even though the power remained at 50 PS (37 kW). The model was sold as Steyr 125 Super, mainly in Germany. It was offered until 1937 and only 200 units were made.

== Steyr 220 ==
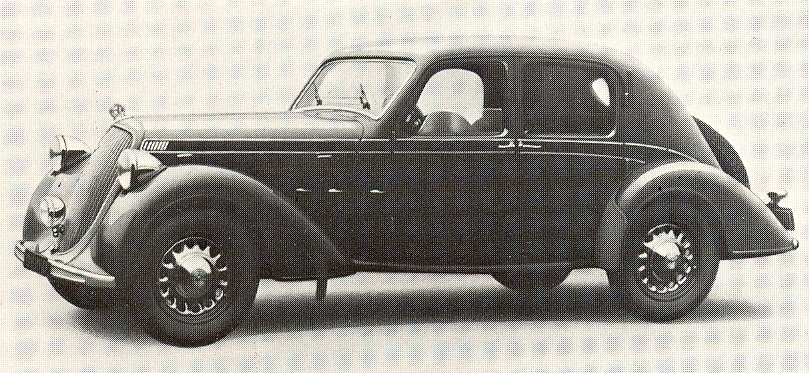
Steyr 220 Sedan (1937)

In 1937 the unaltered body was refitted with a still bigger engine and was named Steyr 220. It was available in four body styles (five-passenger limousine, five-passenger cabriolet, and two cabriolet versions with bodies by Gläser Coachworks of Dresden, Germany). All models received inline six-cylinder engine and mated to a four-speed manual. The bore was increased to 73 mm (2.9 in), resulting in an output of 55 PS (40 kW) and a displacement of 2260 cc, or 2.3 litres. Given the car's lightweight and rigid chassis with four-wheel independent suspension, its performance and handling would have been exceptional for the day. This popular model remained in production until 1941 with 5900 units built.

During the Second World War this model, especially in a cabriolet version was designed primarily for Nazi Germany's high rank commanders and officers. A Steyr 220, with the more powerful 2.3 litre engine was the car used in an escape from Auschwitz concentration camp on 20 June 1942. The car was owned by the camp commandant Rudolf Höss and was taken by the escapees (Kazimierz Piechowski, Stanisław Gustaw Jaster, Józef Lempart and Eugeniusz Bendera), who were dressed in SS uniforms and armed accordingly, and driven straight out of the main gates of the camp. The 4 escapees were never recaptured.

== Steyr 220 Gläser Roadster ==
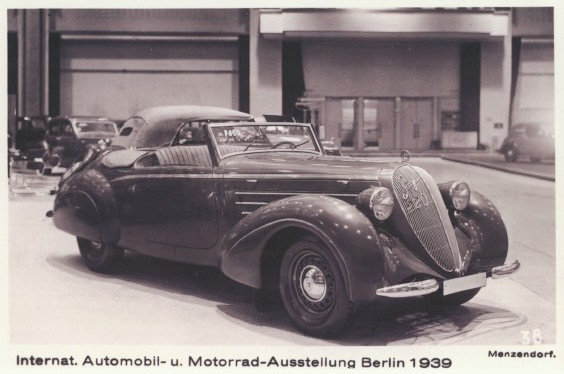
Steyr 220 Gläser Roadster, Berlin Motorshow 1939

Though Steyr built a total of some 5,900 220 series models from 1937 to 1941, only about six of Gläser-bodied variant are known to have been constructed. The impact of the Art Deco Streamline Moderne movement on the car's styling is evident, especially in the flowing design of the front fenders and skirted rear fenders. Only two of the original six cars are known to survive to this day, which makes it a very rare specimen. One is in the United States, owned by a private collector (the other is exhibited at an Austrian museum). It has been honored at the Pebble Beach Concours d'Elegance and won the Best of Show at the Pinehurst Concours d'Elegance.

== Interesting facts ==
- In 1920, famed designer Hans Ledwinka (most famous for the Tatra automobile) designed and built first Steyr, the Wafenauto. Later cars were built under the leadership of Ferdinand Porsche who joined the company in 1929 after working for Mercedes-Benz.
- The company was merged with Austro-Daimler-Puch in 1934. In total, Steyr manufactured 34,776 cars between 1920 and 1940. The 220 was the last pre-war model built by Steyr.
- Erdmann & Rossi produced and supplied various parts for Gläser-Karosserie car bodies.

== Gallery ==
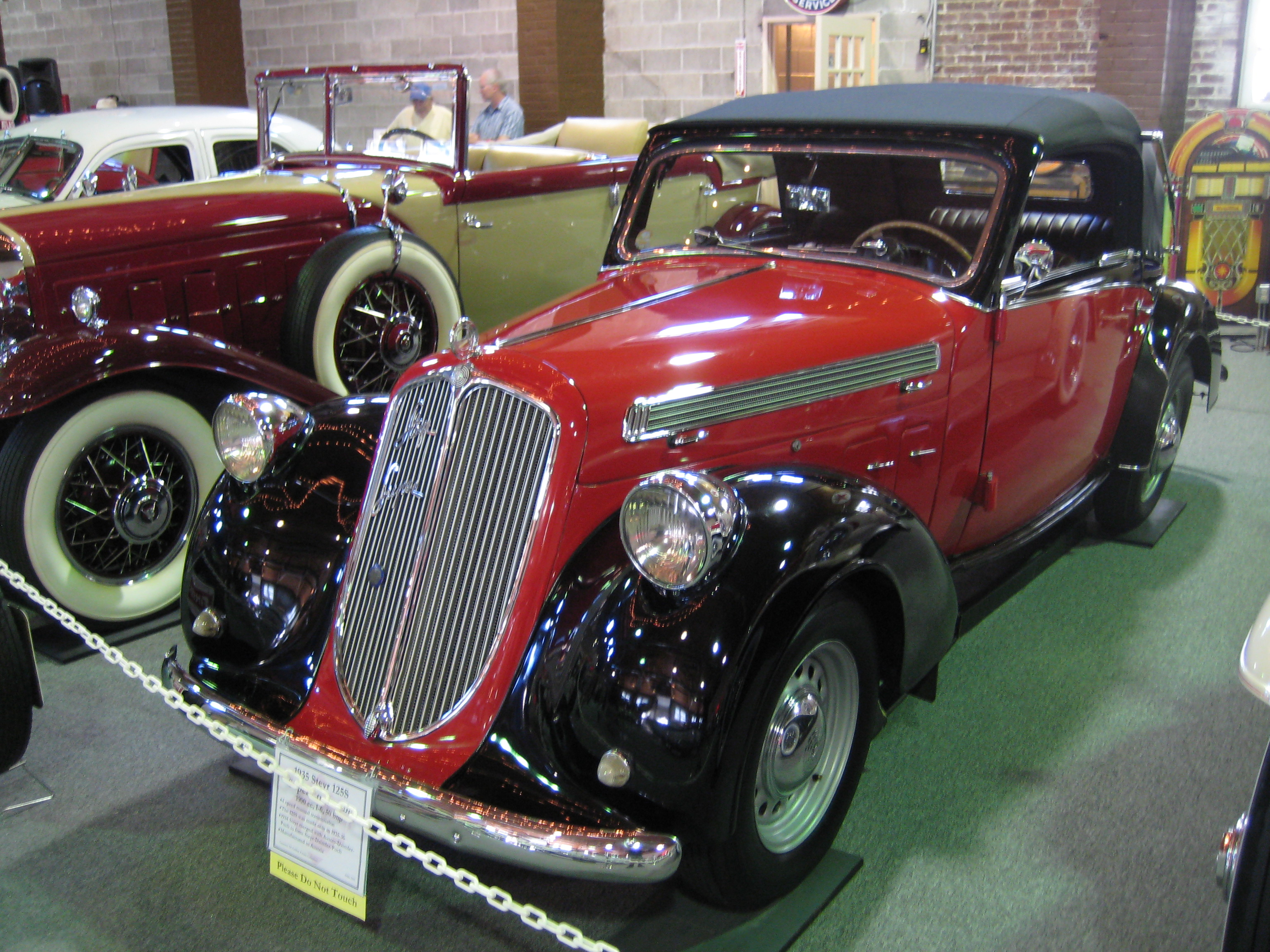
Steyr 125S (1935)

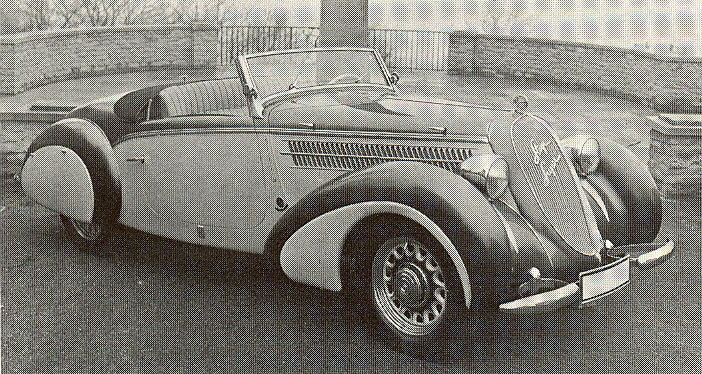
Steyr 125 Super Sport Twoseater (1936)

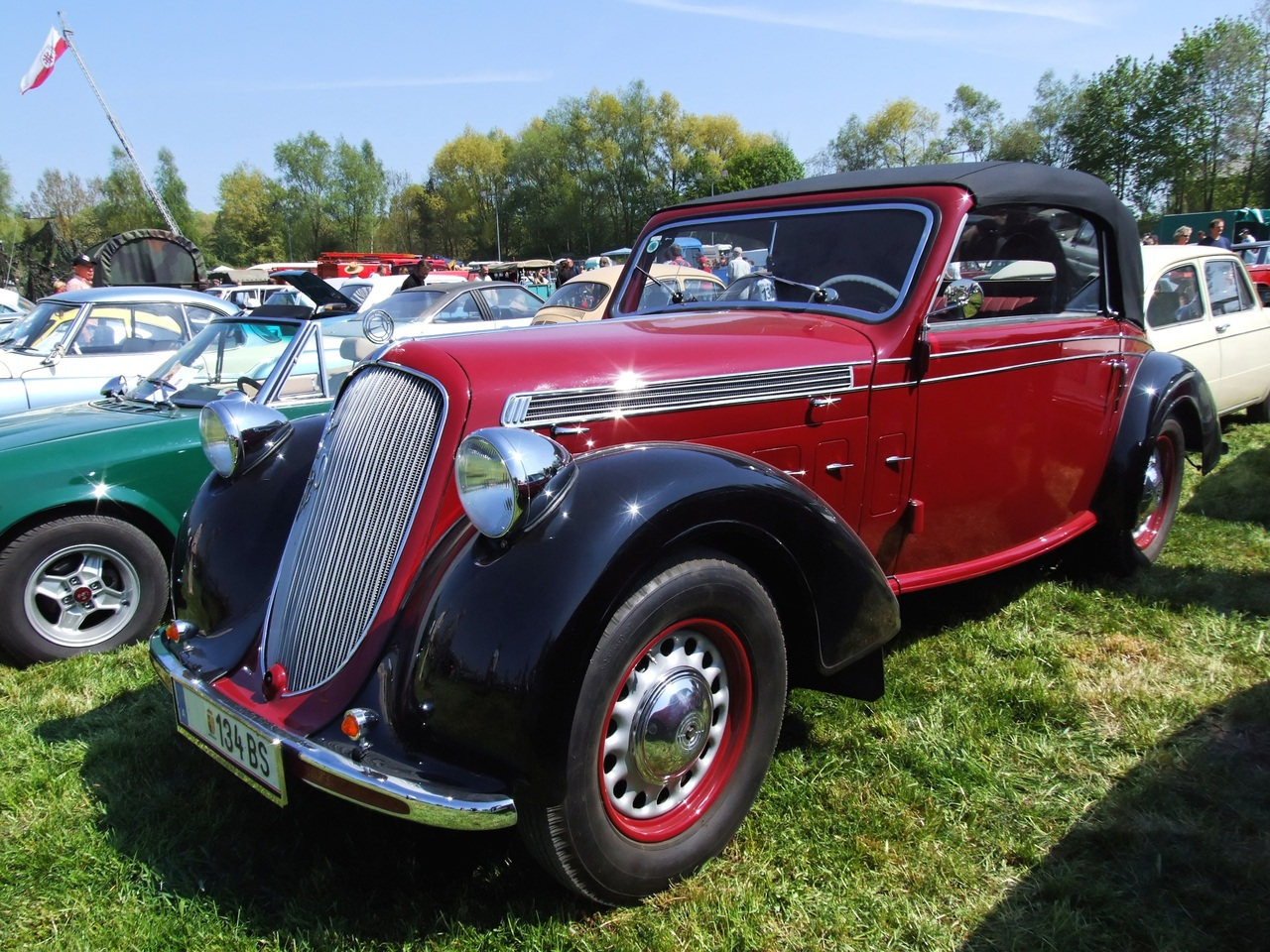
Steyr 220

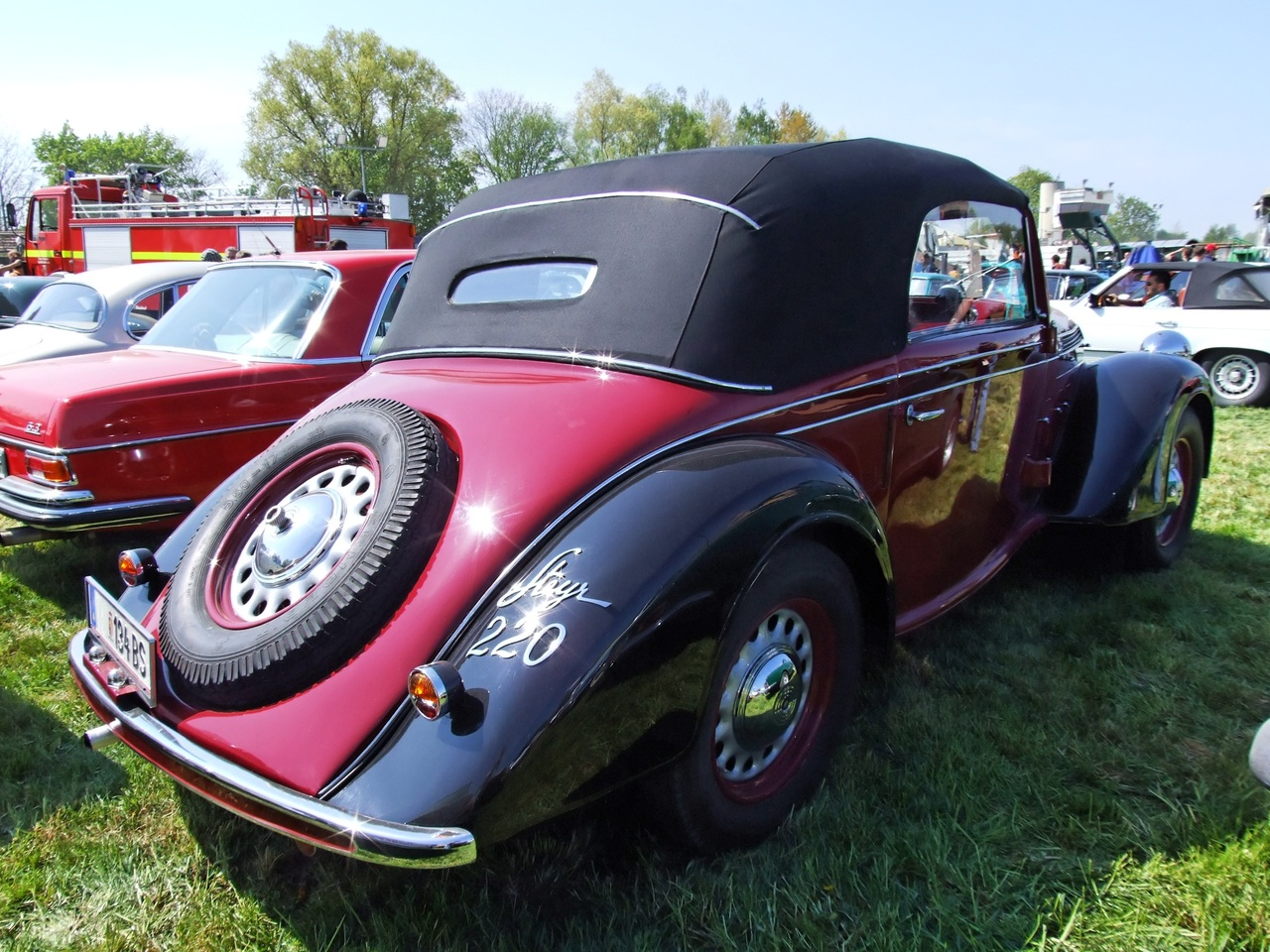
Steyr 220

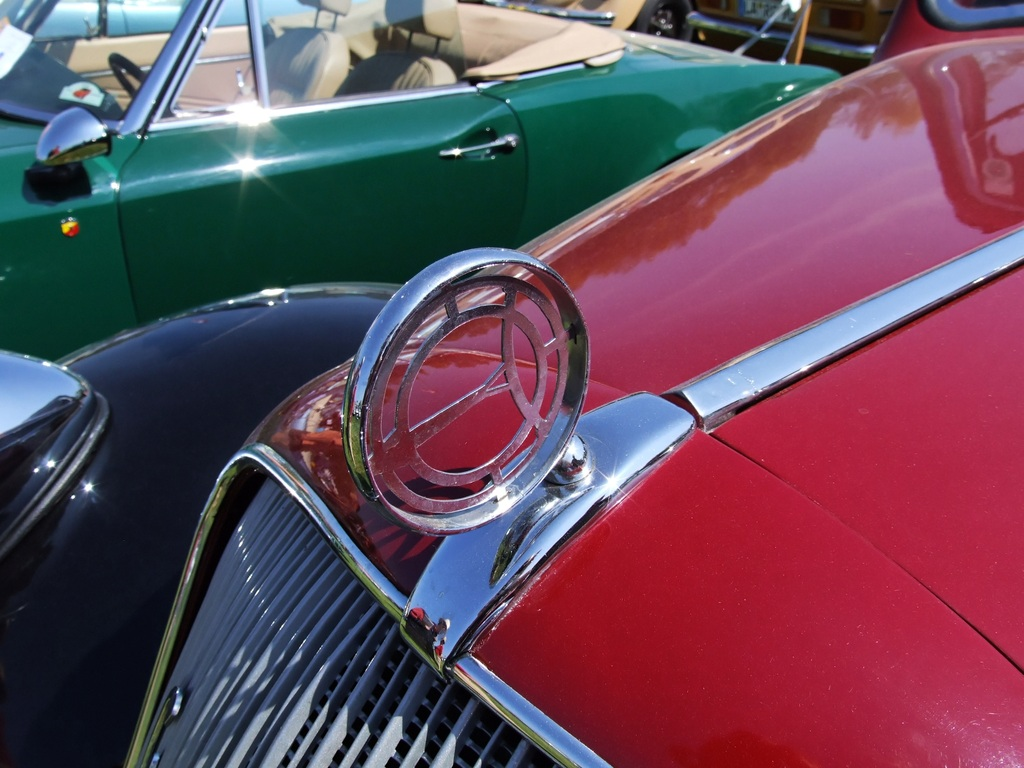
220 hood ornament

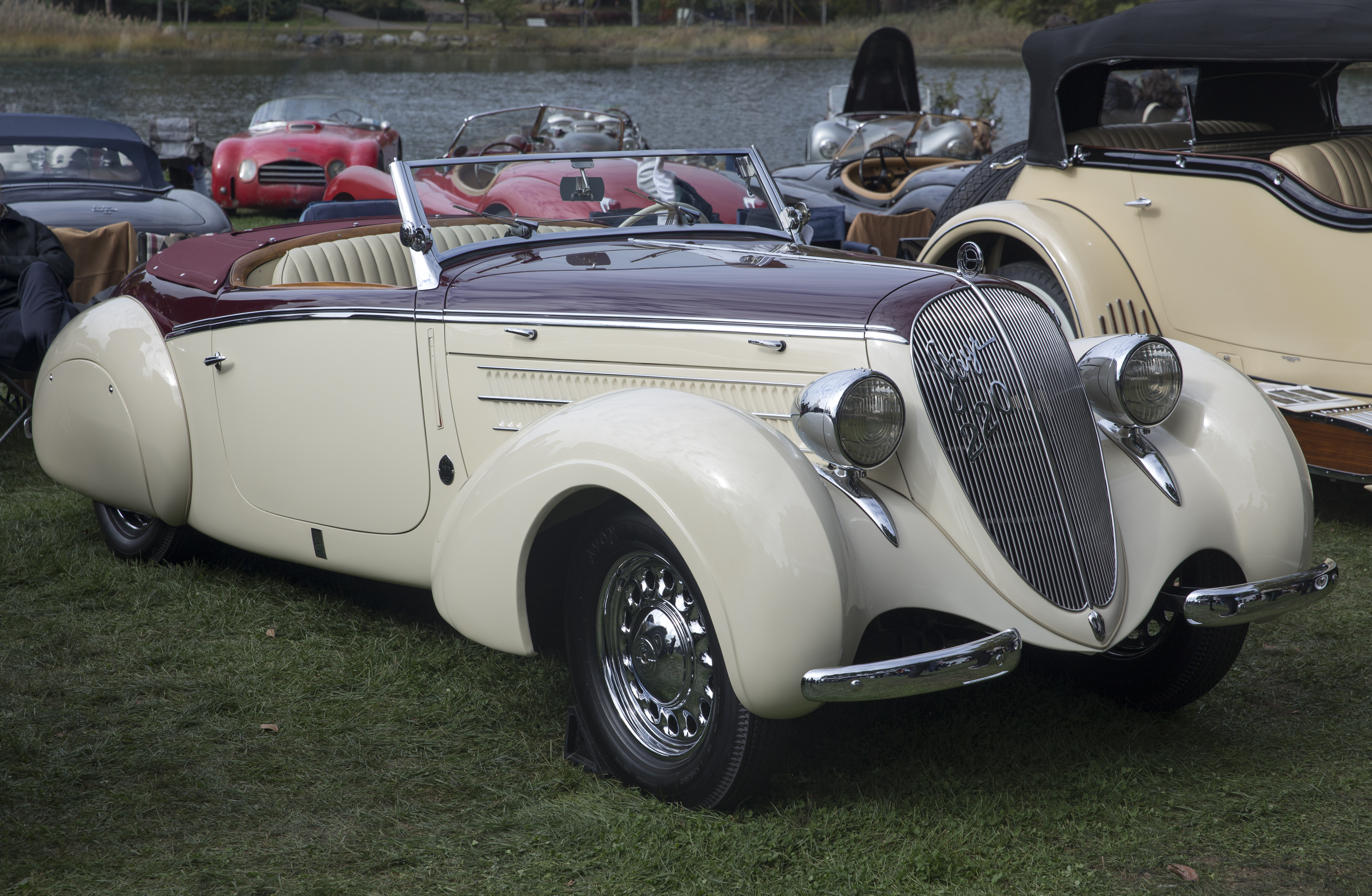
1938 Steyr 220 Sport Roadster (Gläser)
