= Steyr 100 =

Steyr 100, 200
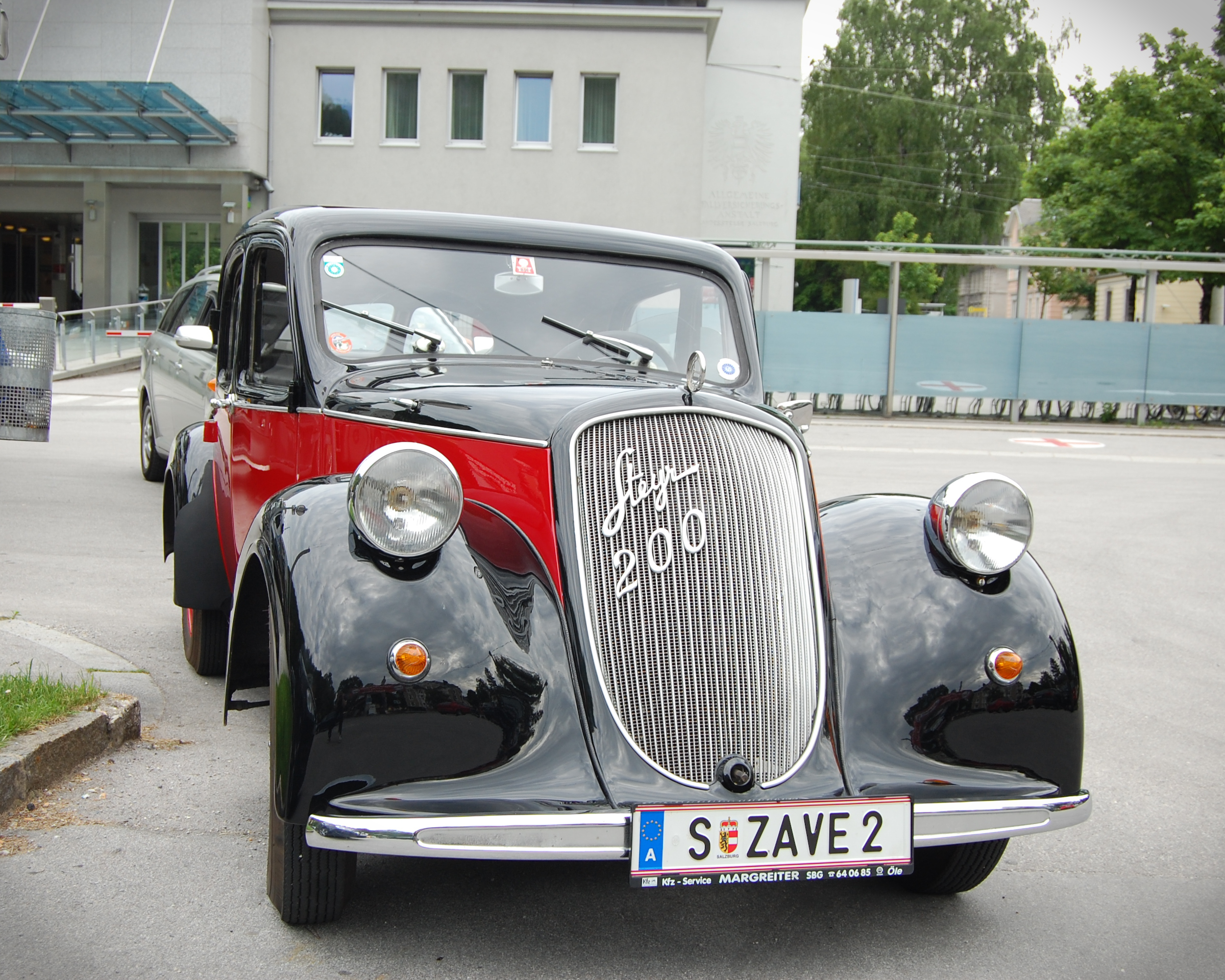

Overview
- Manufacturer: Steyr-Daimler-Puch AG
- Also called: Steyr 110 (light commercial)
- Production: 1934–1936 (100): 2,850 built 1936–1940 (200): 5,040 built
- Assembly: Steyr, Austria

Body and chassis
- Class: Small family car
- Body style: 4-door sedan 2-door convertible
- Layout: Front-engine, rear-wheel-drive

Powertrain
- Engine: 1385 cc I4 (100); 1498 cc I4 (200)
- Transmission: 4-speed manual

Dimensions
- Wheelbase: 2.60 m (102 in)
- Length: 4.37 m (172 in)
- Width: 1.61 m (63 in)
- Height: 1.55 m (61 in)
- Curb weight: 950–1,000 kg (2,090–2,200 lb)

The Steyr 100 and 200 were a series of medium-sized cars built by the Austrian manufacturer Steyr-Daimler-Puch AG from 1934 to 1940. The four-door streamlined body designed by engineer Karl Jenschke was manufactured in Steyr, a 1933 prototype was assembled by Gläser-Karosserie GmbH in Dresden, Germany.

== Design ==
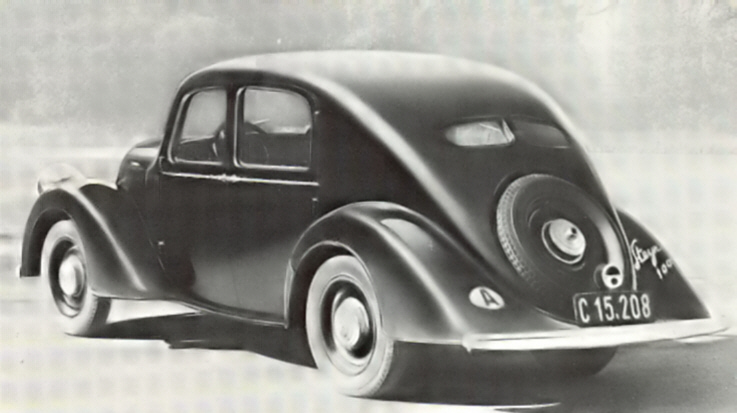
Steyr 100 (1935)

The cars had a four-cylinder straight engine and a four-speed manual gearbox driving the rear wheels on a leaf spring swing axle suspension, a layout already introduced by Steyr on larger cars. The independent front suspension, however, was a first for the company. The four-speed transmission had synchronizations on the top two gears, while the 1.4-liter four-cylinder engine received five main bearings. A four-door saloon, two-door convertible, and a bare chassis were available, in addition to a light commercial model called the Steyr 110.

The 100 could reach a maximum speed of about 100 km/h (62 mph). Though not high-powered they could easily climb the Austrian Alpine mountain passes, demonstrated by the Salzburg governor Franz Rehrl, when on 22 September 1934 he and engineer Franz Wallack travelled the Grossglockner High Alpine Road driving a Steyr 100, about one year before the official opening. In 1935-36 the Austrian travel writer Max Reisch crossed Farther India (Burma, Thailand, and Laos) in a Steyr 100 and continued his journey through the United States.

After 2850 vehicles built the design underwent improvements in 1936, creating the more powerful Steyr 200. An additional 150 examples of a light commercial Steyr 110 had also been built. One technical novelty for the 200 model was the starter motor, which also doubled as an alternator. The 200 also received an updated body, with a somewhat larger (still split) rear windshield. In late 1937 the grille was redesigned to match the larger 220 model, losing the central bar but gaining a "200" script, and of a convex rather than concave shape. 5040 such vehicles were produced until 1940.

== See also ==
- Steyr 120
