= Steyr Type XXX =

Steyr Type XXX (Type 45)
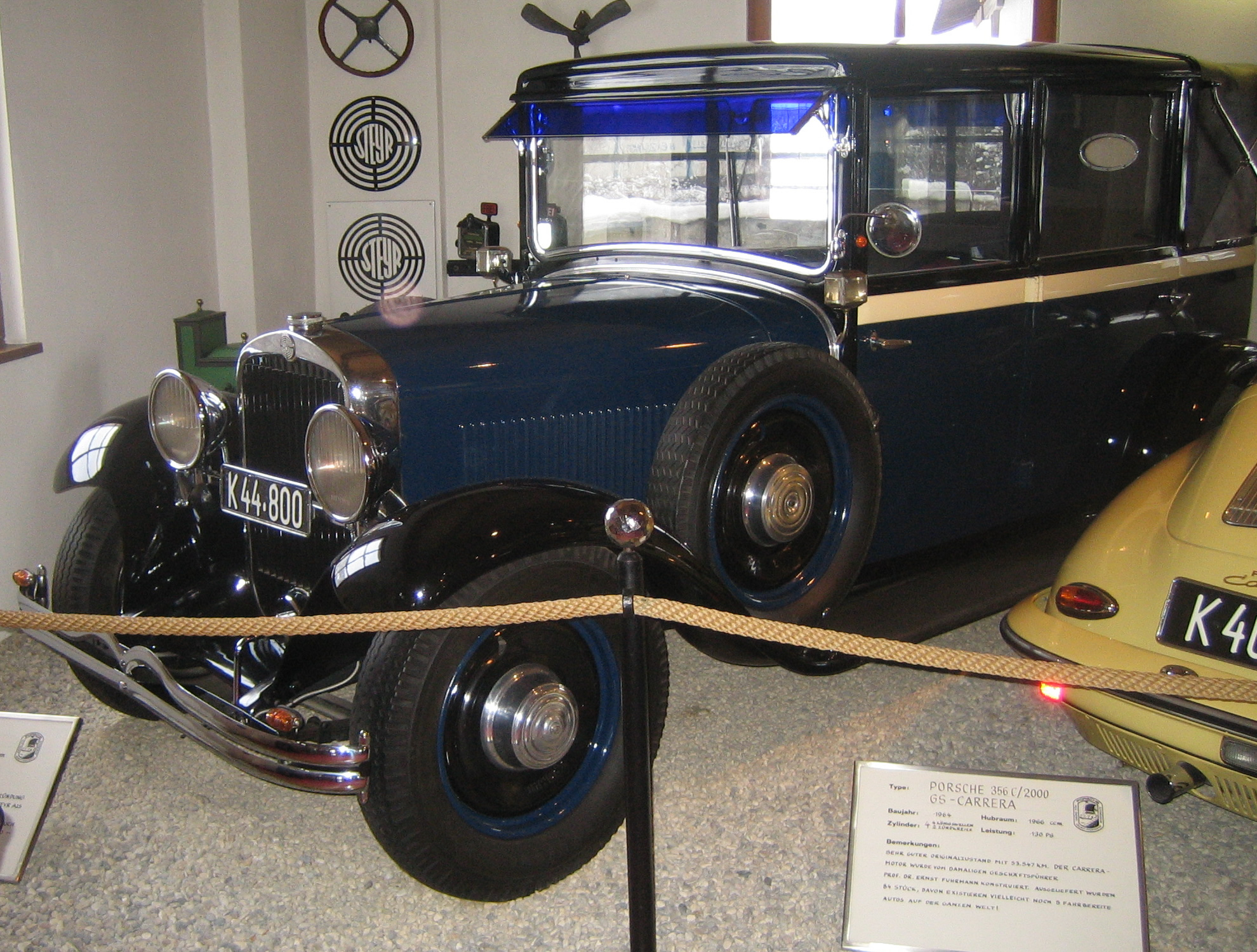

Overview
- Manufacturer: Steyr
- Also called: Steyr Type 530
- Production: 1930–1936
- Designer: Ferdinand Porsche

Body and chassis
- Class: Torpedo / grand tourer
- Layout: Front-engine, rear-wheel-drive

Powertrain
- Engine: 2.1–2.3 L (130–140 cu in) I6 12-valve OHV; 38–54 hp (28–40 kW) @ 3800 rpm (naturally-aspirated)
- Transmission: 4-speed manual

Dimensions
- Wheelbase: 3,250 mm (128 in)
- Length: 4,800 mm (189 in)
- Width: 1,710 mm (67 in)
- Height: 1,580 mm (62 in)
- Curb weight: 1,415 kg (3,120 lb)

The Steyr Type XXX (45), which was later developed into the 530, was a grand tourer-style torpedo car, developed and built by Austrian manufacturer Steyr, and designed by Ferdinand Porsche, between 1930 and 1936.
