= Steyr-Daimler-Puch =

Defunct manufacturing conglomerate based in Steyr, Austria

Steyr-Daimler-Puch AG
- Type: Aktiengesellschaft (Joint stock company)
- Industry: Transportation, Defense
- Predecessor: Austro-Daimler
- Founded: 1864; 162 years ago
- Defunct: 2001; 25 years ago
- Fate: Split up by divisions; remainder acquired
- Headquarters: Steyr, Upper Austria, Austria
- Products: Vehicles (cars, trucks, buses, motorcycles); Weapons
- Parent: Reichswerke Hermann Göring

Steyr-Daimler-Puch (German pronunciation: [ˈʃtaɪɐ ˈdaɪmlɐ ˈpʊx]) was a large manufacturing conglomerate based in Steyr, Austria, which was broken up in stages between 1987 and 2001. The component parts and operations continued to exist under separate ownership and new names.

== History ==
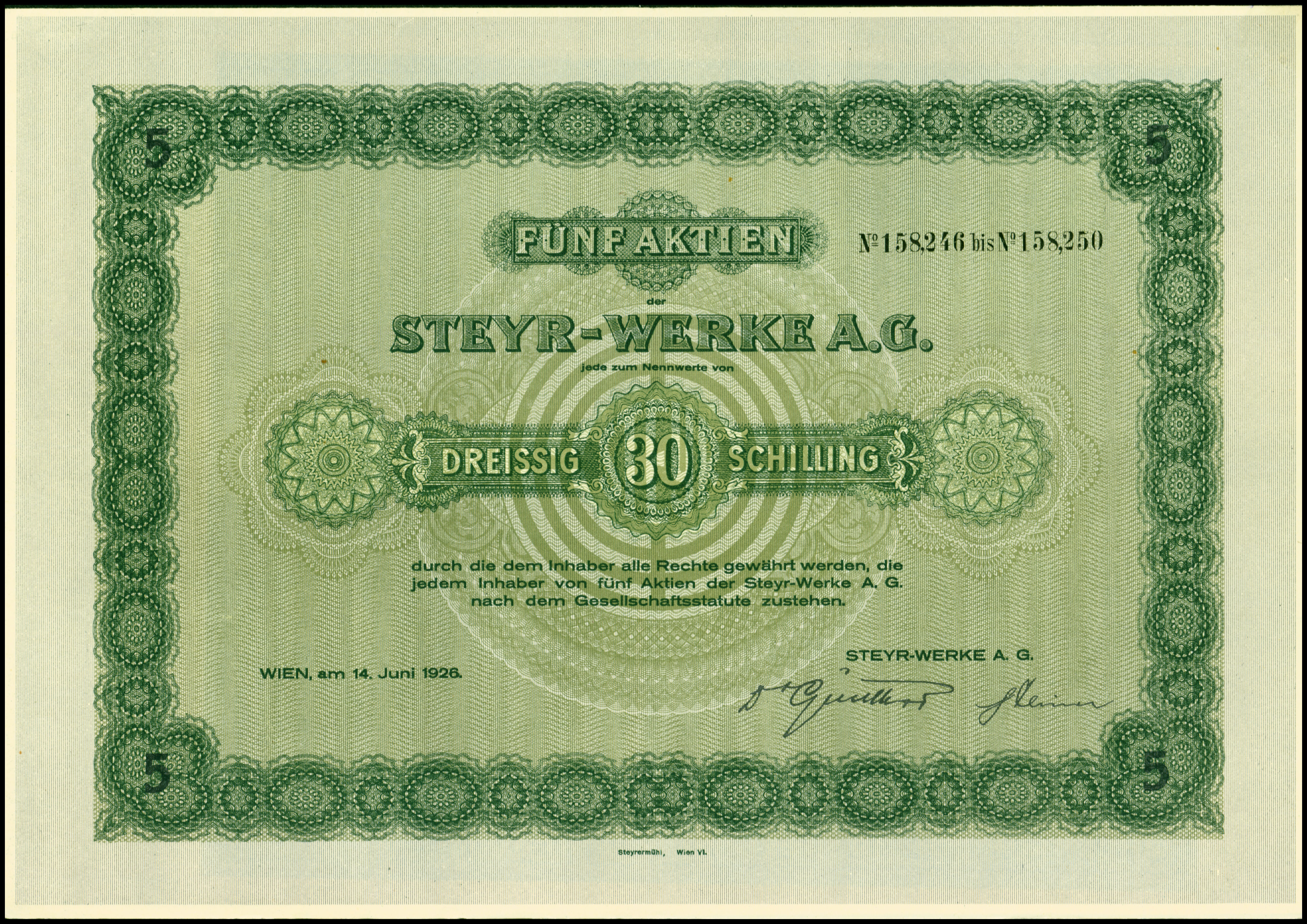
Share of the Steyr-Werke AG, issued 14. June 1926

The company, initially known as Josef und Franz Werndl and Company was founded in 1864 as a rifle manufacturer. The company began producing bicycles in 1894. It grew rapidly during the First World War, by the end of which it employed 14,000 people. Steyr automobiles were made after 1918. In September 1917 Steyr recruited Hans Ledwinka, now remembered as one of the great automotive engineers of the twentieth century, but then relatively unknown, to the position of "Chefkonstrukteur", to lead the creation of their automobile manufacturing business.

The first Steyr car, the six cylinder Type II "12/40" appeared in 1920. It spawned sports versions with a list of international achievements. The 1.5L six Type XII of the late twenties won international motor press acclaim.

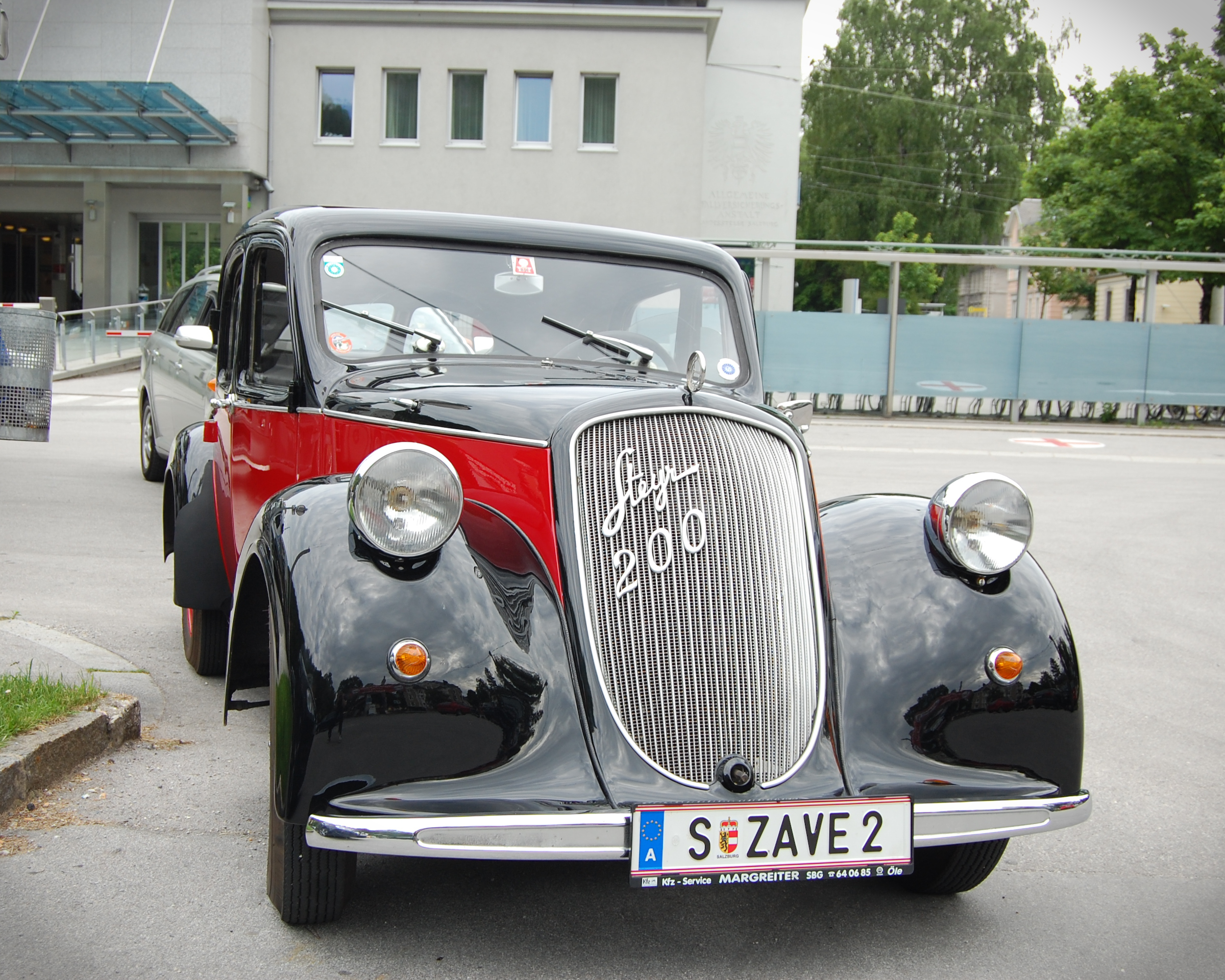
A Steyr 200

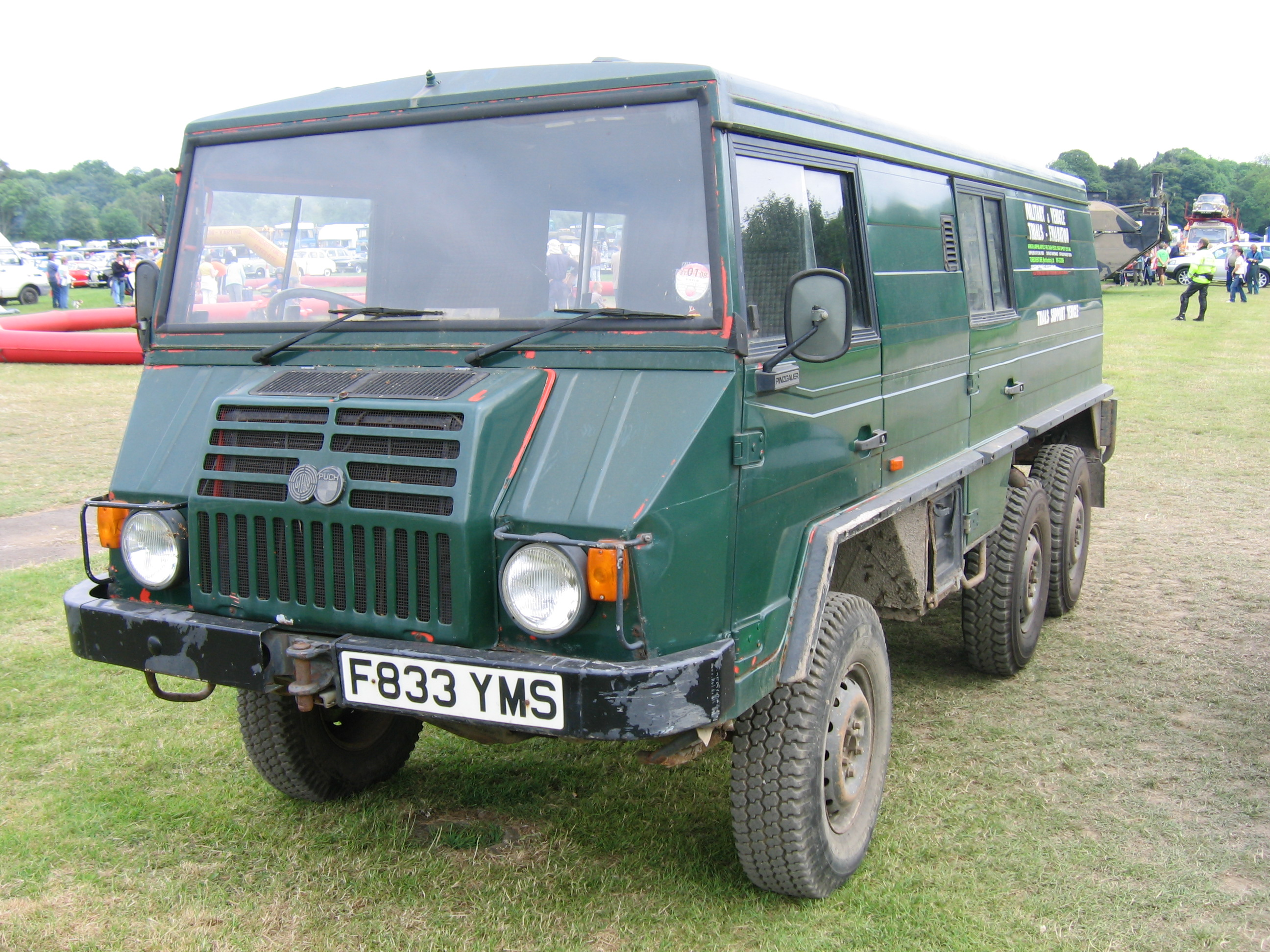
Steyr-Puch Pinzgauer

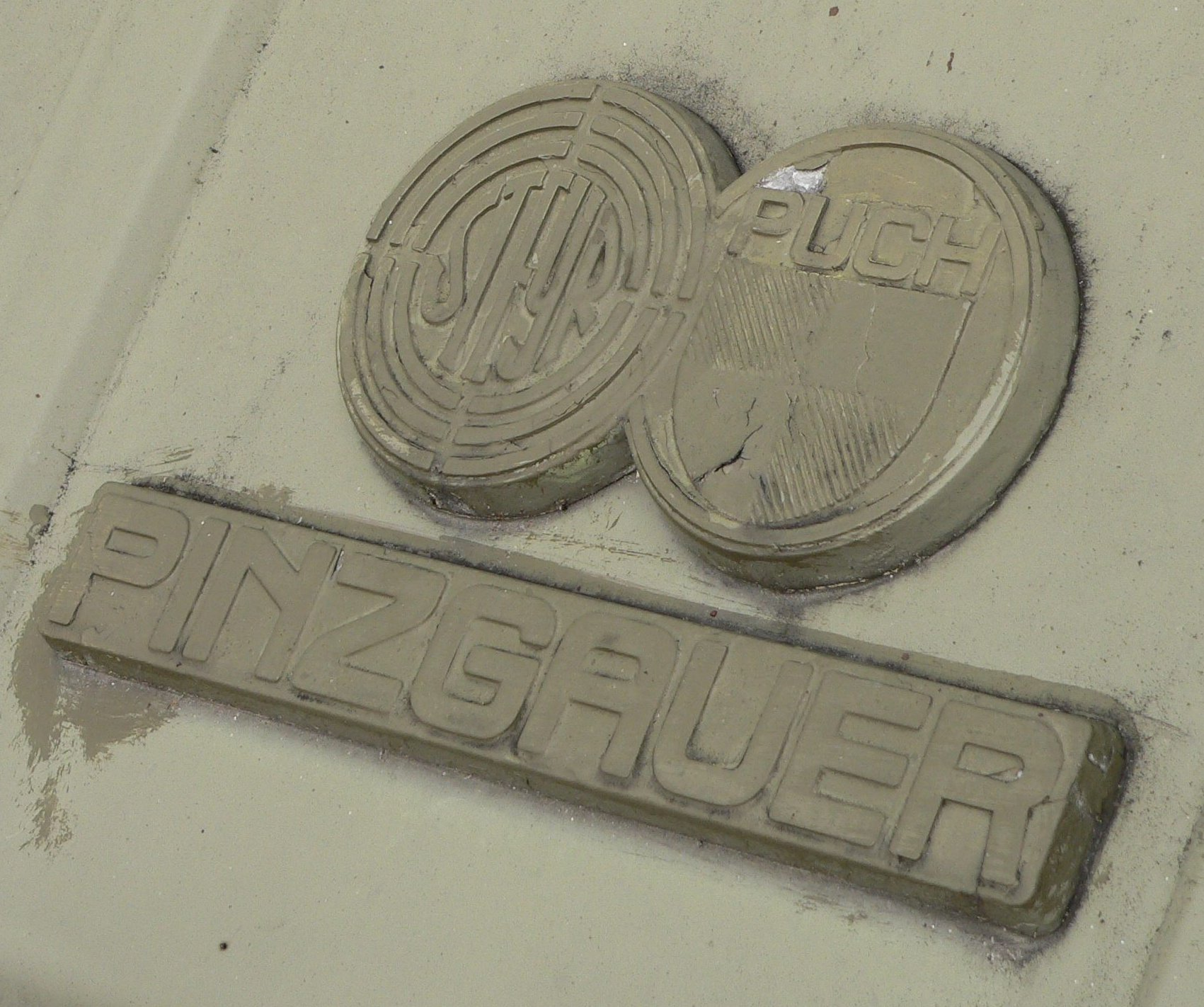
The logo of Steyr-Puch on the Pinzgauer

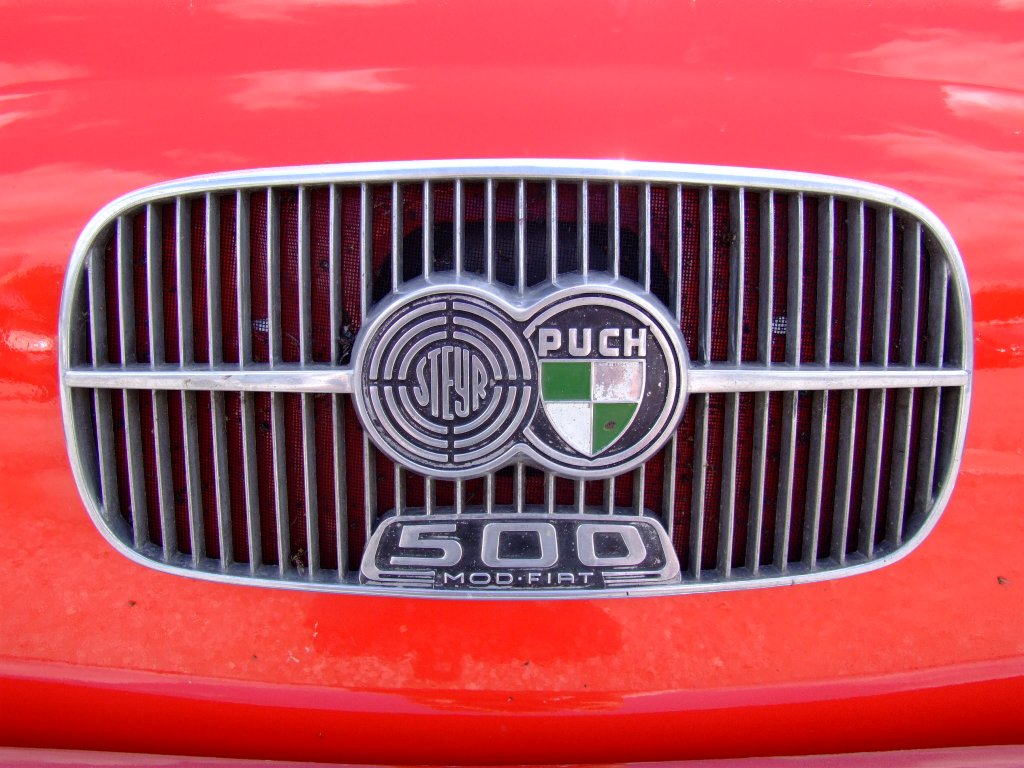
The logo of Steyr-Puch on the Puch 500

The company changed its name to Steyr-Werke AG in 1926. In 1934, Steyr merged with Austro-Daimler-Puch to form Steyr-Daimler-Puch. The range produced in these years mainly consisted of very modern designs, sporting partially or complete unit construction bodies in streamlined livery, from the one-litre Steyr 50 to the 2.3 L Steyr 220 "six".

During World War II, when Austria was part of the Third Reich, Steyr-Daimler-Puch's Generaldirektor Georg Meindl de became one of the first German industrialists to suggest the use of slave labour from concentration camps to boost manpower at Steyr. The request was approved and prisoners were brought by guarded train from the Mauthausen-Gusen camp complex 30km away in Gusen. Later, on 5 January 1942, Meindl wrote a letter to SS Gruppenführer Ernst Kaltenbrunner recommending a new 'satellite' prison camp be constructed to house prisoners nearer the Steyr factory complex, explaining how this would reduce the time and loss of prisoners in transit to and from work while also reducing security and transport overhead costs.

This was approved and prisoners were used for facilities construction (bomb shelters, etc.), and to supplant manufacturing labor. This practice was not yet common at other larger German companies, though others followed suit including Mercedes-Benz and MAN. The vehicle range was for military use, including the Steyr RSO Raupenschlepper Ost with an air-cooled 3.5 L V8 engine designed by Ferdinand Porsche, who worked for the company at that time. War-time production there included small arms, assault rifles, machine guns, and aircraft engines.

After the war, Steyr-Daimler-Puch built diesel engined trucks and buses, small and heavy tractors and resumed passenger car production. First, Steyr assembled the FIAT 1100E, then put their own engine in a Fiat 1400, renaming the car the "Steyr 2000". From 1957 through to the early 1970s it produced the tiny Puch 500 under license from FIAT, again with an engine of Austrian design.

Most prominent was its range of off-road cars, from the two-cylinder Haflinger and the 4 x 4 or 6 x 6 Pinzgauer, the Fiat Panda 4x4 (999 cc) to the Mercedes-Puch G. SDP was the initial designer and manufacturer of these utility vehicles. The Haflinger was produced from 1959 to 1974, the Pinzgauer from 1971 to 2000, and the Puch G (also known as Mercedes G-Class) from 1979.

The company's Puch division produced a line of motorcycles, mopeds, and motor scooters marketed in the United States through Sears Roebuck including the Puch 250 SGS which was delivered in a cardboard crate box to the customer's home. The Austro-Daimler branch built heavy tractors and trucks for the imperial Austrian army (before 1915). The main Steyr civil agricultural tractor production started in 1947.

After the war Steyr-Daimler-Puch resumed manufacturing bicycles and mopeds, gradually establishing distributors in several countries to manage their sales. Steyr made bicycles for sale for other retailers, most notably Sears. In the mid-1970s "Steyr-Daimler-Puch America" was incorporated in Connecticut to manage importation and distribution of bicycles and mopeds. Puch Austro-Daimler bicycles remained in production at Graz in Austria until the motorcycle and bicycle fabrication portions of the company there were sold in the mid 1987 to Piaggio & C. S.p.A. of Italy.

== Gradual dissolution ==
In 1987, Steyr-Daimler-Puch AG began selling portions of its different production lines to form separate companies, which included Steyr Nutzfahrzeuge AG ("Steyr Commercial Vehicles", SNF; still based in Steyr) for truck manufacturing, Steyr Bus GmbH (in Vienna) for bus manufacturing, Steyr-Daimler-Puch Fahrzeugtechnik AG (SFT) and the EUROSTAR joint venture in Graz-Liebenau for assembly of automobiles and, in 1990, Steyr Tractor (Steyr Landmaschinentechnik AG).

Other production lines were spun off or sold outright to form independent companies, including Puch's motorcycle division going to Piaggio and Steyr Mannlicher producing weapons. In 1990, the diesel engine division was spun off into Steyr Motorentechnik GmbH, which in 2001 became an independent company, renaming itself Steyr Motors GmbH. Steyr Landmaschinentechnik AG (Steyr Tractor) was sold to Case Corporation in 1996 and renamed Case Steyr Landmaschinentechnik (and is part of CNH since 1999).

Automobile production remained with Steyr-Daimler-Puch Fahrzeugtechnik (SFT) until Magna International acquired a majority holding in 1998. In 2001–2002 SFT was absorbed fully by Magna, becoming Magna Steyr.

In 1998, the production of military vehicles was sold to an Austrian investor company, which named it Steyr-Daimler-Puch Spezialfahrzeug GmbH (SSF). In 2003, SSF was sold to the U.S. company General Dynamics, a defence-equipment manufacturer and into General Dynamics Land Systems.

== Steyr trucks ==
Steyr's first truck was the Typ III, presented in 1920. Steyr built traditional bonneted trucks in the post war years. In 1968 the distinctive cab over Steyr 90 series was introduced. This was followed by the 91 and the 92 series, built until MAN took over Steyr's truck production in 1990. A version of the 92 series is still built as the 12M18/12S18 for a number of military users, and was sold by Britain's ERF as the ES-series.

Steyr 26S40 in Dnipro, Ukraine.

Some MAN trucks are still available with "Steyr" branding for the Austrian market. The smaller 590/690-series of trucks utilized the cabin of the Hanomag-Henschel F-series; they were facelifted in 1982 and became the 591/691.

Beginning in 1994, Steyr used MAN's F2000 cab for the NSK series (Neue Schwere Klasse, or "new heavy class"), while the light and medium duty trucks were the NLK and NMK (Neue Leichte Klasse and Neue Mittlere Klasse), based on MAN's similarly situated L2000 and M2000 ranges respectively. The NLK ranged from the 6S10 (6.5 tons, 102 PS) to the 11S23 (11 tons, 233 PS). The NMK range was from 12 tonners up to the three-axle 25S26. These cabins were referred to as "Typ 152" in Steyr's internal parlance.

- Typ XII
- Typ XVII
- Typ 40
- Typ 6x4
- Noriker
- Typ 270
- Typ 260
- Typ 370
- Typ 380
- 380-480 series
- 580-586 series
- 680-880 series
- Typ 680M
- 1968-1979 Steyr 90 series
- 1969-1982 590-690 series
- 1978-199? Typ 91
- 1982-198? 591-691 series
- 1986-2003 Typ 92

== Military vehicles ==
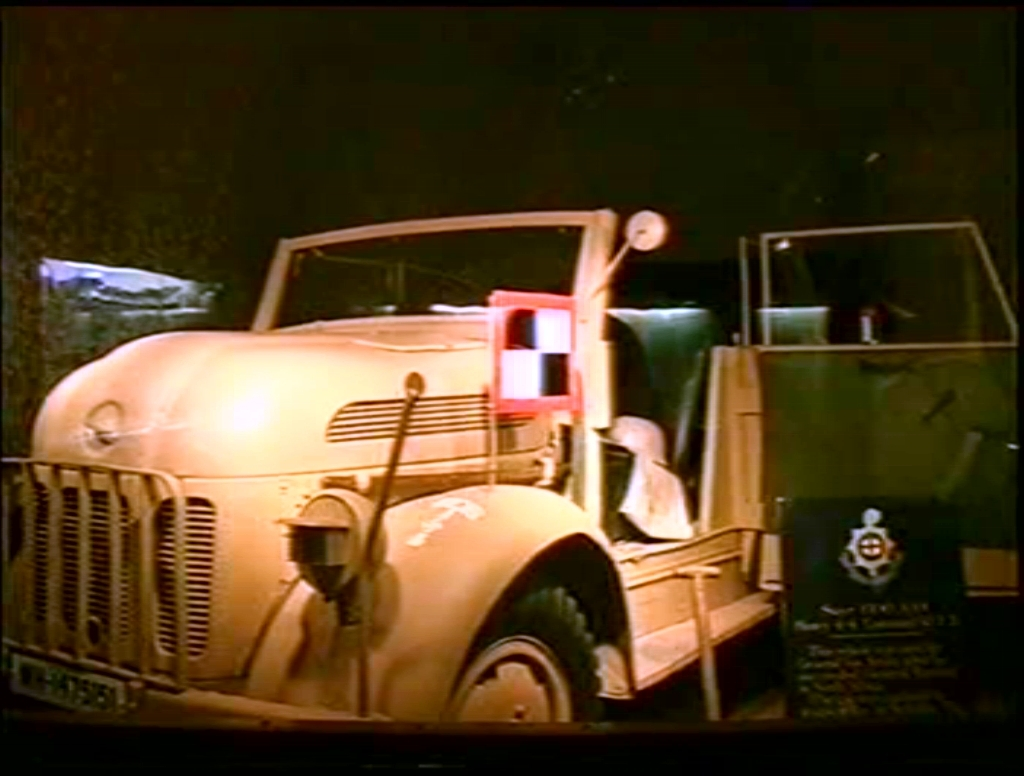
General Von Arnim's Staff Car at the Eastbourne Redoubt

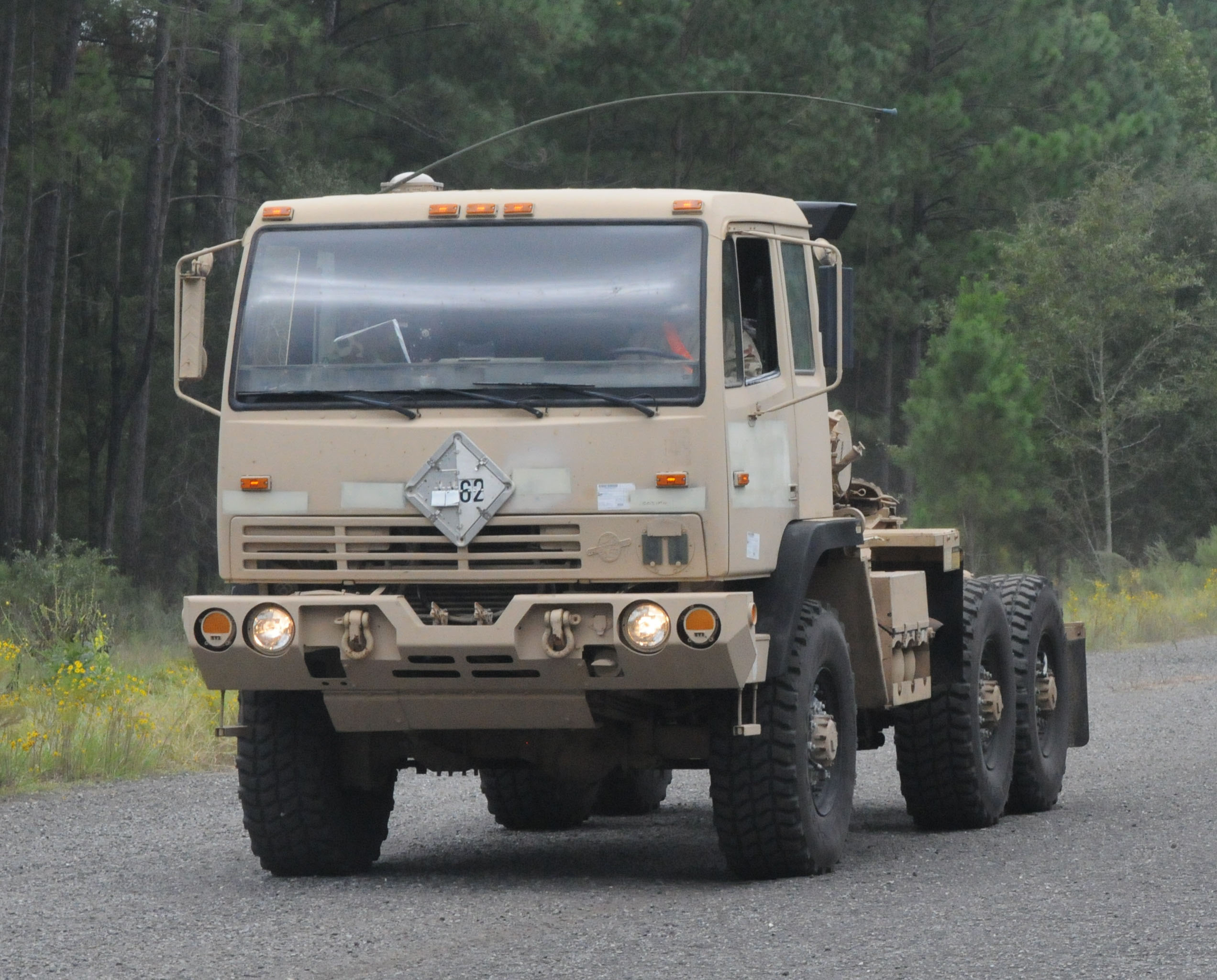
A US Army BAE FMTV truck based on the Steyr 12M18

=== Historic ===
- Steyr 1500A light truck & staff car
- ADGZ
- Raupenschlepper Ost tracked prime mover
- Greif A1 4KH7FA-SB armoured recovery vehicle
- SK-105 Kürassier light tank/tank destroyer
- Saurer 4K 4FA APC
- Steyr 4K 7FA APC
- Steyr 1491 Percheron heavy truck - variant built by UTDC as 24M32 Heavy Logistic Vehicle Wheeled for the Canadian Army
- Pinzgauer
- Haflinger

=== Modern ===
- Pandur 6X6 APC
- Pandur 8X8 APC
- Steyr 12M18 heavy truck - variant built by BAE Systems Land & Armaments as Family of Medium Tactical Vehicles for the US Army
- ASCOD AFV

== Weapons ==
Steyr Daimler Puch produced handguns as well, e.g. the pistols Steyr SP (1957) and Steyr GB (designing began in 1968), the sniper rifle Steyr SSG 69 (1969) and the assault rifle Steyr AUG (1977). Steyr-Mannlicher, founded in 1989, continued the production of handguns until 2019, then the name of the company was changed to Steyr Arms.

== See also ==
- Flugmotorenwerke Ostmark
- Eastbourne Redoubt Museum possesses and displays General Hans-Jürgen von Arnim's Steyr 1500A Afrika Korps Staff Car. It was captured by the Royal Sussex Regiment.
- László Almásy used Steyr vehicles to explore the Sahara in the 1920s and 1930s. He is the basis of the lead character in the English Patient.
