= Gläser-Karosserie =

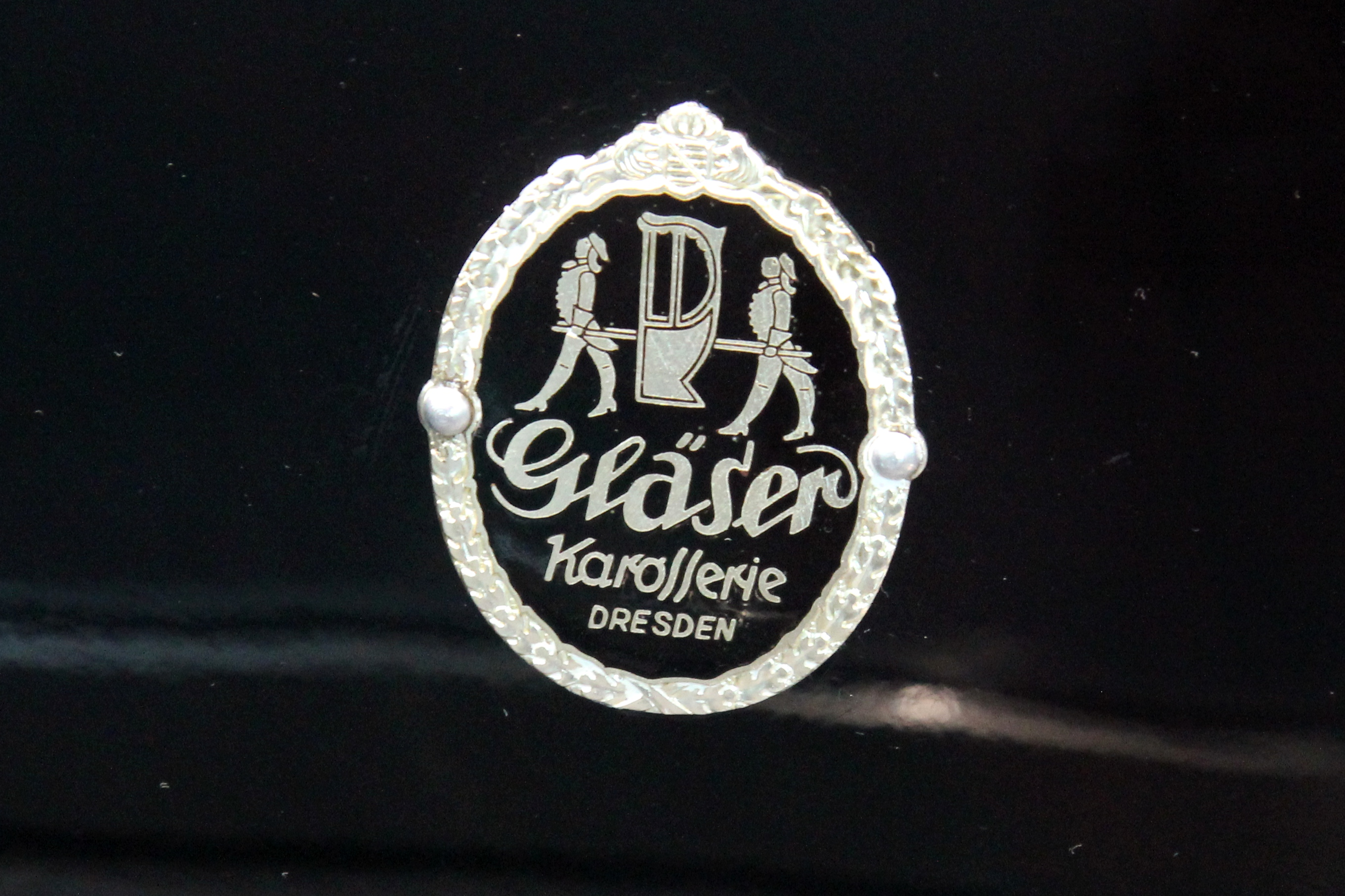
The "Gläser-Karosserie" badge in the twentieth century used an historical theme.

Gläser-Karosserie GmbH was a German coachbuilder, based in Dresden, and known in particular as a producer of bespoke cabriolet car bodies. The enterprise was founded in 1864 and lasted, by some criteria, till 1952.

== History ==
Chronology "Gläser-Karosserie" until the brand expired in 1951 / 52. (Yellow markings relate to the Radeberg site)

=== Early years ===
In 1864 Carl Heinrich Gläser (1831-1902), then a saddler by trade, established a little factory for the manufacture of carriages and sleighs along the Rampischen Alley (Rampischen Gasse 6), near the Frauenkirche, in Dresden.

The quality of the carriages and chaises he produced led to orders from the Royal stables in Dresden. The business also extended to upholstering, painting and finishing carriages supplied as basic shells by other makers. In 1898 Friedrich August Emil Heuer who had hitherto been one of the manufacturers supplying unfinished carriages, became a co-owner of the Gläser business. Heuer at this time was running his own forge and carriage workshop at Radeberg, some 18 km (11 mi) east of the city, but his working relationship with Gläser was already well established: he had indeed married Gläser's daughter back in 1885. When Gläser, by now more than 70, died in 1902 Heuer was left as the sole owner of the flourishing business that bore his father-in-law's name.

=== Motorcar bodies ===
1902 was also the year in which Gläser-Karosserie decided to diversify into car bodies, although it was not till 1905 that they were able to deliver their first vehicle, using a 45 hp (34 kW) chassis from Daimler of Untertürkheim. Heuer continued to build the business, while his brother Robert Heuer took over the running of the operation in Radeburg. At the luxury end of the market customers were able to specify highly individualised bodies. The company acquired several patents including one for a window opener known as the "Silentium", reflecting its qualities. A small number of tramcars was also produced for Dresden during the early years of the twentieth century. During this time, the Radeberg operation became increasingly closely integrated with the business in Dresden, and taken together the business provided work for approximately 200 people. In 1905 the acquisition of a small steam powered generator at Radeberg gave the operation, for the first time, access to a power supply to support the hand craftsmanship on which operations depended.

In 1913 a site for the construction of larger premises was acquired, from a former curtain and lace making business, at Arnold Street (Arnoldstraße 18-24) in the Johannstadt quarter of Dresden. A modern factory building was constructed into which the workshops were relocated. The Rampischen Alley premises were converted for use a prestigious showroom complex.

=== War and the return of peace ===
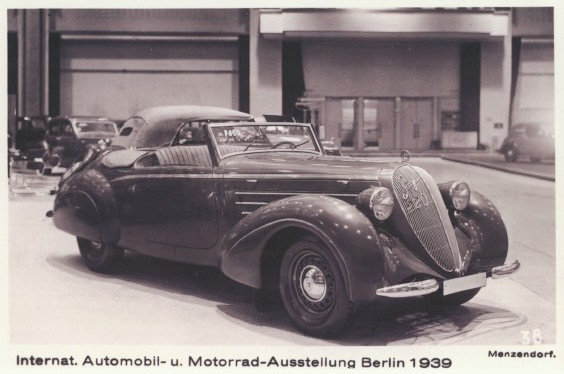
Steyr 220 Gläser Roadster, Berlin Motorshow 1939

During the First World War Gläser switched to war production, making wings and landing gear for Fokker fighter planes. After 1918 the focus returned to car bodies and horse-drawn carriages. Simultaneous production of both car bodies and horse carriages was not a problem, since at this stage both employed the same meticulous timber frame technology, with the gaps in the frame filled by hand-made sheet panels or by fabric, applying the Weymann patented methods. It was not till the 1930s that timber frame bodies began to be superseded by "all-steel" car bodies, manufactured using large expensive presses (or labour-intensive hand-beaten steel panels), applying, in particular, the patent technology from Ambi Budd who built their own large-scale car body factory in Berlin, transforming the economics of automobile production by the end of the 1930s. This increasingly restricted bespoke car body builders to the upper end of the price scale, but that was already the sector where Gläser-Karosserie were at their strongest, providing bespoke bodies for customers who had purchased their cars in bare chassis form from any one of a wide range of auto makers including (but not restricted to) Adler, BMW, Hanomag, Horch, Mercedes-Benz, Opel, Steyr and Wanderer. Body types included the Phaeton, Coupé, Landaulet, Limousine, Pullman and (still a particular Gläser speciality) Cabriolet.

=== Succession ===
Georg and Erich Heuer worked with their father in the business, later taking over from him in 1918, although the father remained active as a director till 1932. Georg, notably, concentrated on car body design, producing cabriolet and other designs in the early 1930s of remarkable harmony and symmetry. His "six-light" Pullman limousine design was a milestone both artistically and technically. The firm was also known for mechanically ingenious roof folding mechanisms, for which it held several patents.

=== Bankruptcy and rebirth followed by more war ===
Nevertheless, after several financially challenging years as the world economic crisis unfolded, and following the cancellation of a major contract by General Motors Gläser-Karosserie found itself in financial difficulties, and in Summer 1932 Georg Heuer shot himself. His brother Emil, now aged 74, took on sole responsibility for the company, but the financial difficulties persisted and in 1934, with the business undergoing an extensive restructuring at the direction of the Dresdner Bank, Emil also died.

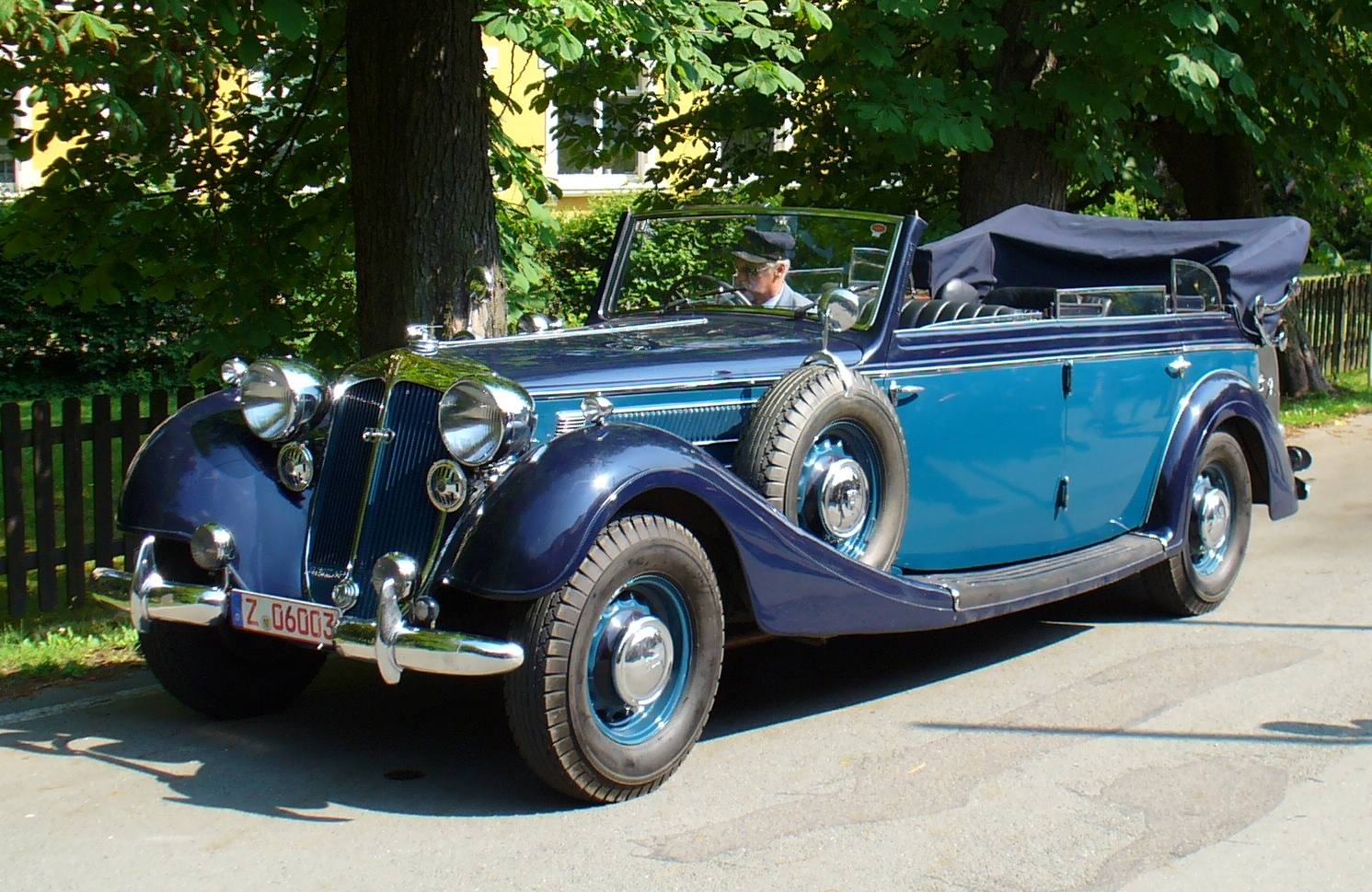
Horch 850 (1937) with Pullman-Cabriolet body by Gläser

On 12 June 1933 Gläserkarosserie G.m.b.H was founded, effectively a new company formed from the remnants of the bankrupt old one. Leadership passed to Willy Bachmann, by training a plumber, who had married Heuer's daughter, Johanna, in 1929. Dresdner Bank was the principal banker of Gläserkarosserie G.m.b.H and also of Auto Union, another Saxony based auto-business that underwent a major restructuring in order to survive the aftermath of the Great Depression. During the rest of the 1930s Gläserkarosserie produced cabriolet and other bespoke bodies for Auto Union brands, notably luxury bodies for Horch cars, but they were also producing bodies for use with chassis from other mainstream German car makers including Opel and BMW. From 1935 the factory was also supporting German rearmament with special bodies for "commando/staff cars" based on Steyr and Skoda chassis, and specialist conversions of Ford and Opel commercial vehicles. By the time war resumed in September 1939 they were also producing a plethora of components and sub-assemblies for Messerchmitt fighter planes. Overall activity was by now at a high level, and as the war progressed it became hard to find workers with the skill levels needed. By the mid-1940s Bachmann had received an allocation of 1,000 foreign workers along with between 150 and 180 Soviet prisoners of war in order to keep the factories running.

The massive bomb attack that destroyed large parts of Dresden on 13 and 14 February 1945 did not spare Gläserkarosserie. The Dresden premises were largely destroyed, with just four administration office rooms left. Some of the materials and production equipment for the Messerschmitt sub-assemblies survived. however, and the government ordered that these be crated up and placed on 40 rail wagons. They were then moved to Neustadt an der Waldnaab in March 1945, where it was believed that they were less at risk of destruction from aerial bombing by the British and Americans.

=== After the war - East Germany ===
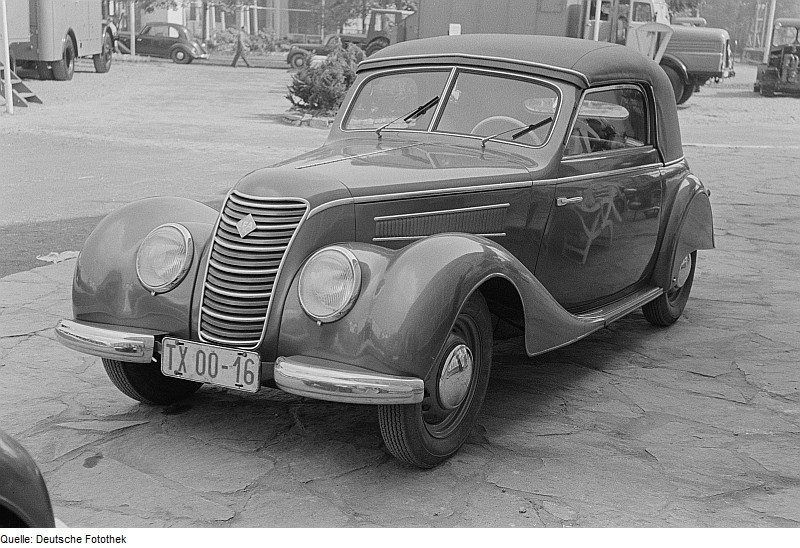
IFA F8 "Export cabriolet" built by KWD and exhibited at the 1954 Leipzig Trade Fair

War ended in May 1945 with Saxony in the Soviet occupation zone in what remained of Germany. Despite the destruction of Dresden, the out of town Gläserkarosserie premises at Radeberg had not been destroyed. There was nevertheless a period of much uncertainty as to what would become of the operation under Soviet administration, while much machinery and tooling found their way to the Soviet Union, both as part of the reparations package agreed between the victorious powers, and less formally.

The territory was remodeled according to Soviet precepts: these did not favour private companies. Gläserkarosserie re-emerged as a Volkseigener Betrieb / VEB (Publicly Owned Enterprise), the "VEB Karosseriewerk Dresden (KWD)". Production resumed with a succession of one-off specials for the occupation forces. Serial production started, in 1947, of cabriolet bodied versions of the IFA F8, which was in effect a barely changed successor to the pre-war DKW F8. Two years later, in October 1949, the Soviet occupation zone was replaced by the Soviet sponsored German Democratic Republic: the division of Germany into two separate countries had evidently become permanent. By 1953 43,600 car bodies had been produced by KWD (formerly Gläserkarosserie) in Saxony.

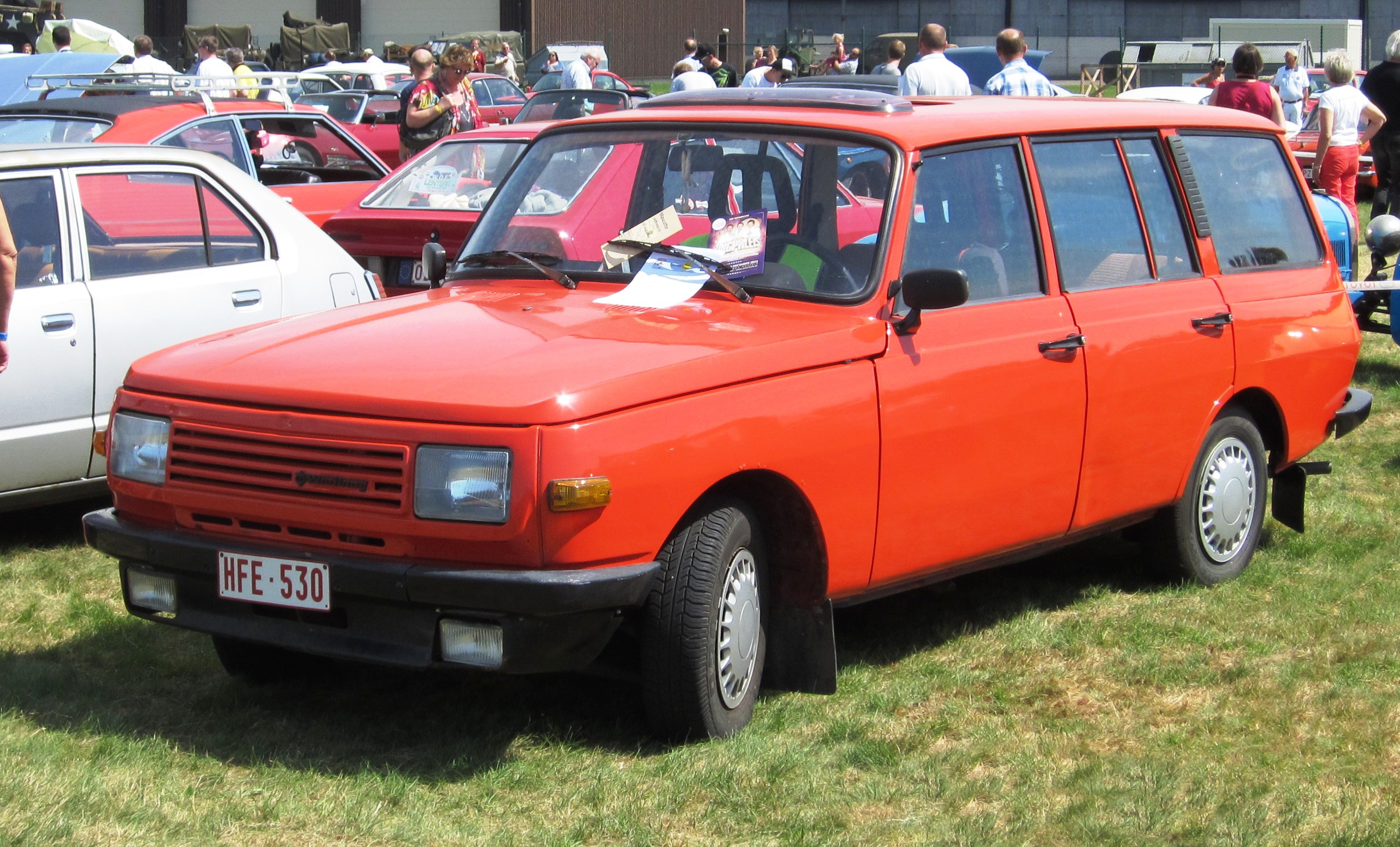
Station wagon "Tourist"-bodied Wartburg 353s were assembled at the KWD Radeberg plant during the 1980s and 1990s.

As the 1950s progressed, the enterprise also produced bodywork for Wartburg models and for the low volume Sachsenring P240. In 1956, a cabriolet version of the Wartburg 311 joined the line-up, with 2,670 completed by 1960 when this variant was withdrawn. KWD also participated in development of the composite plastic bodywork of the AWZ P70 Zwickau, itself a precursor to the better remembered Trabant. Between 1968 and 1990 the plant was assembling the "Tourist" (station wagon/estate car) version of the Wartburg 353 and its Volkswagen powered successor, the Wartburg 1.3. By this time KWD was also assembling Bastei caravans at three nearby satellite factories in Dresden, Rosenthal and Wilsdruff. During the 1970s and 1980s KWD activities became increasingly integrated with those of Wartburg.

Following reunification, formally in October 1990, the political and legal context changed dramatically. In 1994 "VEB KWD" was privatised, becoming a major supplier of floor panels and a plethora of other sheet steel components to Volkswagen and to the German auto industry more generally. It is now part of the Wolfsburg based Schnellecke Group.

=== After the war - West Germany ===
Erich Heuer relocated machinery left behind by the Soviets to Ullersricht near Weiden in north-eastern Bavaria. Under the new arrangements, Bavaria was now part of the US occupation zone, which in May 1949 would become part of the new German Federal Republic, thereby politically separated from the business's Saxon homeland till 1990.

Here he was able to produce between 100 and 250 cabriolet bodies for the Porsche 356. There were also 16 aluminium bodies produced for the legendary Porsche 540 "America Roadster". However, following miscalculations Heuer had to abandon production in November 1952.
