= Rotel Tours =

Companies based in Bavaria

- Industry: Tourism
- Founded: 1945; 81 years ago
- Headquarters: Tittling, Germany
- Products: Adventure travel tours
- Services: Tour operator
- Website: www.rotel.de

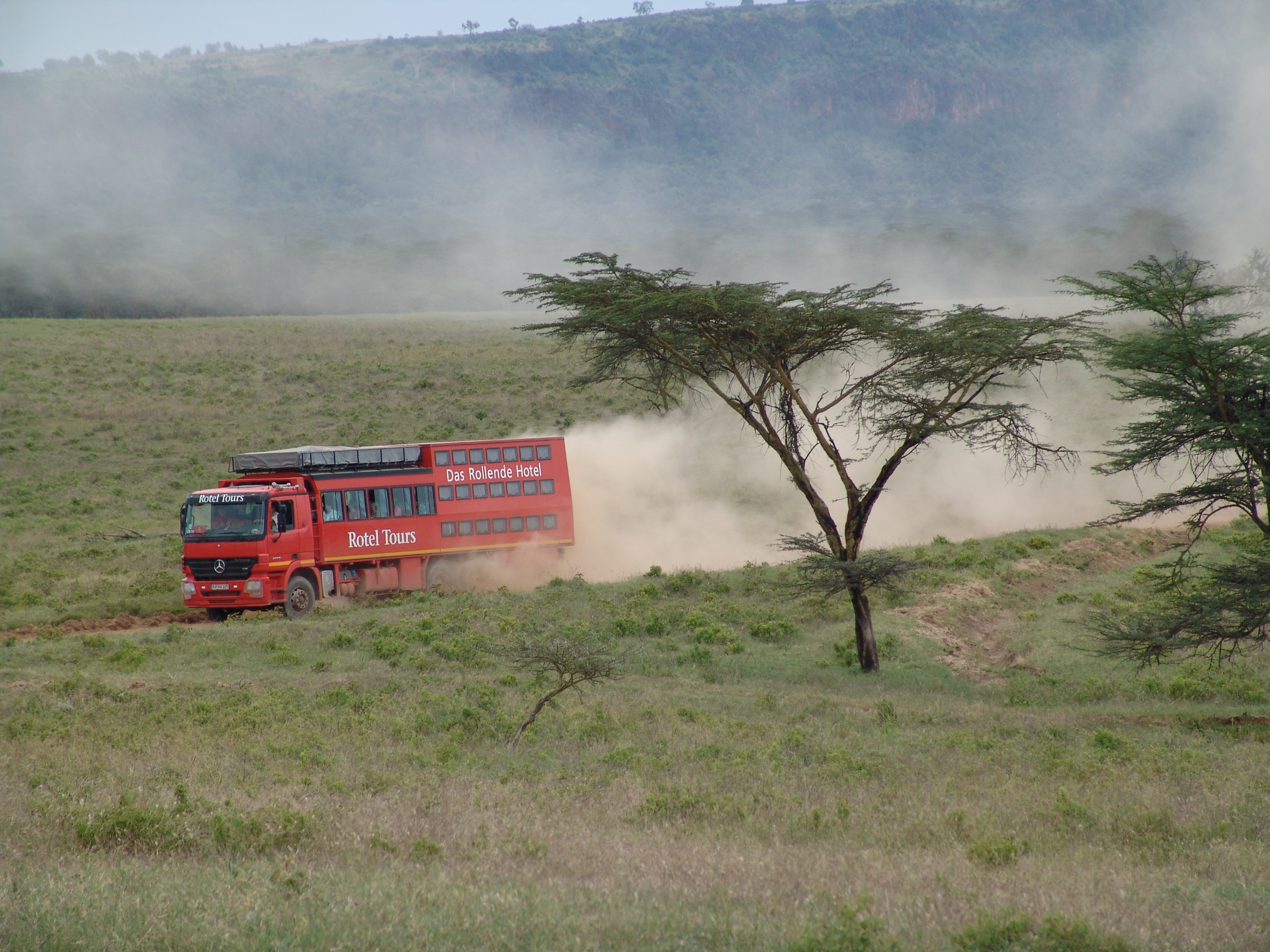
Rotel Bus with all-wheel drive (2007).

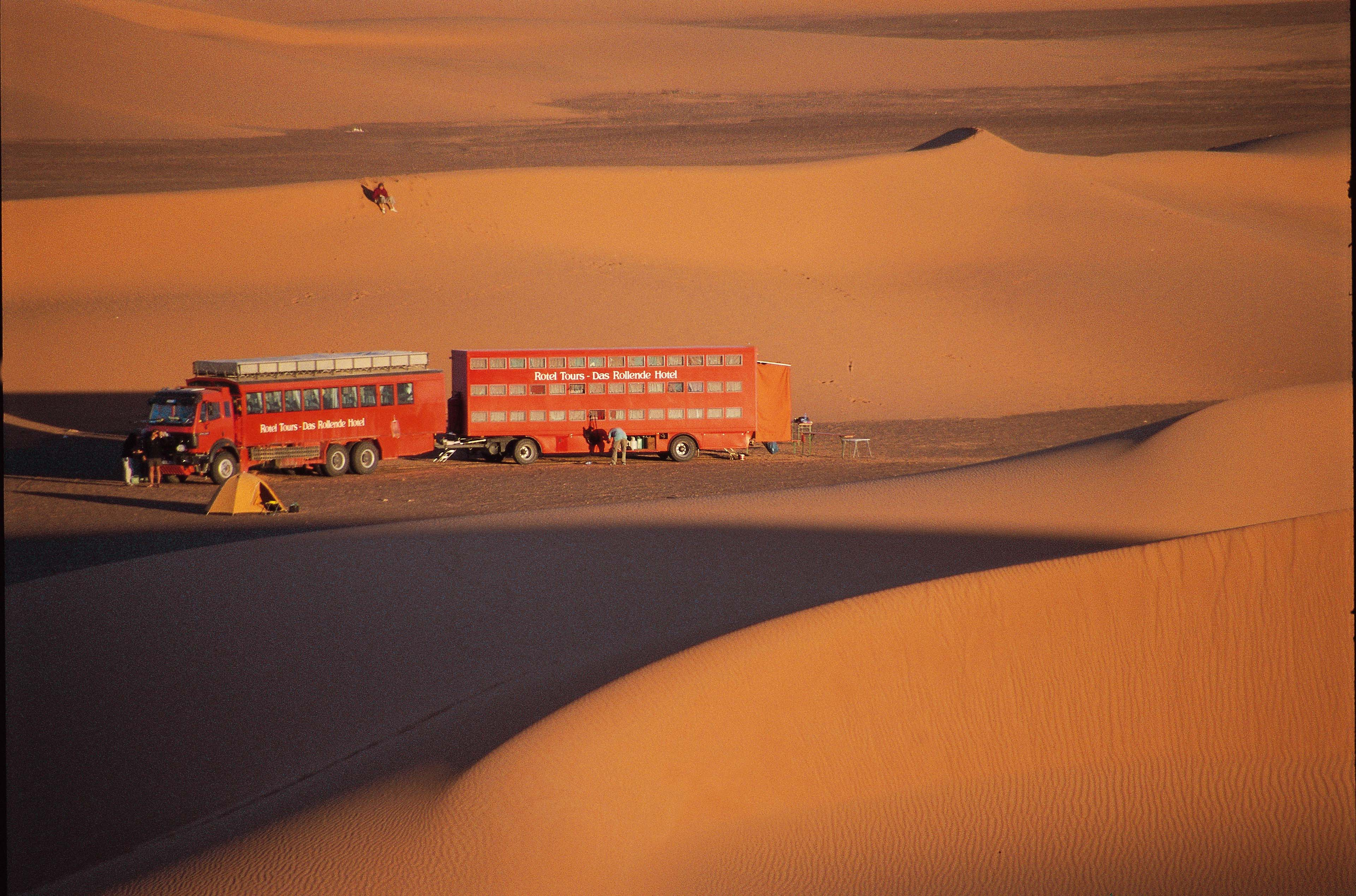
34-seat bus with trailer.

Rotel Tours is a tour operator that specializes in overlanding via "rolling hotels", custom built buses in which guests also sleep. The buses can sleep 24-34 guests, a driver and a tour guide. Guests ride in front during the day, and then move to a triple deck of berths in the rear at night.

The company is a subsidiary of Georg Höltl GmBH & Co. KK, based in Tittling, Bavaria, Germany.

The company offers tours on 6 continents.

== History ==
Rotel Tours was founded in 1945 by Georg Höltl.

The company was originally called "Internationale Begegnungsfahrten" ("international encounter trips"). In 1965, 52,000 people traveled via the company. In 1966, the company offered a two-and-a-half-month journey across India as well as pilgrimage trips to Israel.

In 1969, the company operated one of the first tours to cross the Sahara Desert.
