= List of equipment of the Hellenic Army =

Hellenic Army Seal

Most of the heavy equipment and weaponry of the Hellenic Army is either of foreign manufacture, or of foreign design, license built in Greece, in addition to several Greek-upgraded and relatively few types of Greek-developed equipment. Countries of origin include the United States, France, Germany, Russia and others. The few domestically produced armoured vehicles include the ELBO Leonidas APC. However, in recent years, there have been some efforts for new developments by the Greek Defence Industry, such as the new Hoplite MRAP by EODH.

Equipment runs the gamut from state-of-the-art to obsolescent Cold War inventories; the latter are gradually being retired as no funds are available for upgrade. Russian made equipment was received or purchased after the collapse of the Warsaw Pact and second hand US and German equipment was transferred or purchased.

== Individual equipment ==
Model	Origin	Photo	Details
Camouflages
Greek Lizard	Greece		Standard issue
Greek Arid Lizard M24	Greece		Replacing Lizard Camouflage as announced by the Ministry of National Defence (Greece)
Multicam	United States		Used by elements of the Hellenic Special Warfare Command
Helmets
M1 Helmet	United States		Formerly standard issue; currently retained for reserve units, support troops, and training.
PASGT Helmet	United States		Standard issue
MICH	United States		Used by Special Forces
Šestan-Busch BK-ACH-HC	Croatia		In use by the 71st Airmobile Brigade (Greece)
Tactical Vests
ELMON PLATE CARRIER QR	Greece		Issued since 2021
DEFCON 5	Italy		Used by Special Forces
NVGs
Theon Argus	Greece		Used by Special Forces
Theon Nyx	Greece		Used by ETA
Theon Mikron BNVG	Greece		

== Small arms and infantry support weapons ==
=== Firearms ===
Weapon	Image	Origin	Cartridge	Notes
Handguns and submachine guns
Colt M1911		United States	.45 ACP	Service pistol.
Heckler & Koch USP		Germany Greece	9×19mm Parabellum	
SIG Sauer P229		Germany Switzerland	9×19mm Parabellum	Used by EKAM counter-terrorist unit
Glock 17	GLOCK 17 Gen 4 Pistol MOD 45160305	Austria	9×19mm Parabellum	Used by Special Forces and Marines
Glock 21		Austria	.45 ACP	Used by EKAM counter-terrorist unit
FN Five-seveN	FN Five Seven	Belgium	FN 5.7×28mm	Used by EKAM counter-terrorist unit
Heckler & Koch MP5		West Germany Greece	9×19mm NATO	Sub-machinegun of typical version. Lots of its variants are used. Produced by HDS under license.
Heckler & Koch UMP		Germany	9×19mm Parabellum	
FN P90		Belgium	FN 5.7×28mm	Used by EKAM counter-terrorist unit and ETA
Combat Shotguns
Benelli M4 Super 90		Italy	12 gauge	Used by EKAM
Assault rifles, battle rifles and carbines
Heckler & Koch G3A3/A4		Germany Greece	7.62×51mm NATO	Service rifle. Made under license by Hellenic Defense Systems. Sizable number of rifles equipping frontline units got upgraded with SPUHR adjustable stock, aluminum handguard with foregrip and Picatinny rails accommodating Aimpoint CompM4 Red Dot optics. To be upgraded further. A smaller number of rifles were converted to the 'Sharpshooter' version utilizing FAB Defence, MAGPUL and VORTEX OPTICS aftermarket parts.
FN FAL		Belgium Greece	7.62×51mm NATO	
AOR M21		Greece	5.56×45mm NATO	Spotted (unconfirmed reports) in service with 1st Raider–Paratrooper Brigade (Greece)
Heckler & Koch HK33		West Germany Greece	5.56×45mm NATO	HK33E variant produced under licence by EAS
Heckler & Koch G36		Germany	5.56×45mm NATO	Used by ETA
M4		United States	5.56×45mm NATO	M16A2s and M4s are used by the "Special Forces" branch as well as by the airborne battalions of the Hellenic Army.
M16A2/A3/A4/A2E		United States	5.56×45mm NATO	Used by Marines, Airborne units and some special forces units
M1 Garand		United States	.30-06 Springfield	Still in use for ceremonial duties by the Presidential Guard and the Honor Guard of the Ministry of National Defence.
Machine guns
FN Minimi		Belgium Greece	5.56×45mm NATO	Equipped with night vision binoculars NS467C by THEON Sensors. The first 750 pieces are available in two versions (Standard) and (PARA). The remaining 2,320 are MINIMI Mk. 2 with the same number of night-vision binoculars of third generation NS 685C made by THEON Sensors. 1,274 more on order.
Heckler & Koch HK21		Germany Greece	7.62×51mm NATO	HK11A1 variant. Made under license
Rheinmetall MG3		Germany Greece	7.62×51mm NATO	License production by Hellenic Defence Systems
FN MAG		Belgium	7.62×51mm NATO	FN series MAG machine guns continue to be used as highly reliable and functional, at least 1,000 in service.
M60E4		United States	7.62×51mm NATO	Used by Special Forces.
M2 Browning		United States Greece	.50 BMG	500 fitted with a quick change barrel system.
Sniper rifles
Heckler & Koch G3A3ZF		Germany Greece	7.62×51mm NATO	Made under license by Hellenic Defence Systems.
M14 EBR		United States	7.62×51mm NATO	Used by Special Forces.
M110 SASS		United States	7.62×51mm NATO	
Kefefs		Greece	7.62×51mm NATO	Kefefs is a Greek-made bolt-action sniper rifle designed by Hellenic Arms Industry in 1986. Used by special forces.
Sako TRG M10		Finland	.308 Winchester	90 rifles.
Steyr SSG 08		Austria	.338 Lapua Magnum	Used by Special forces.
Barrett MRAD		United States	7.62×51mm NATO	Used by the 32nd Marines Brigade.
Barrett M82A1M		United States	.50 BMG	In 2001, an order was placed for 132 rifles of the upgraded version M82A1M (M107 in American service) to which were added one-piece Picatinny rail, monopod on the stock and various other small improvements. In October 2002 follows a new order for an additional number of M82A1M rifles (Total 200-250).
Barrett M95		United States	.50 BMG	

=== Infantry support weapons ===
Quantity	Weapon	Image	Origin	Notes
Mortars
150	M6C-210		Austria Greece	60mm, range 3 km.
690	E44-E1 EBO		Greece	81mm, range 6 km.
158	E56 EBO		Greece	120mm, range 9 km.
150	M19		United States	60mm/ to be withdrawn.
2,750	MO-81-61		France	81mm, range 4.7 km.
2,750	M29		United States	81mm, range 4.7 km.
624	M30		United States	106.7mm, range 6.8 km.
Grenade launchers
1,240	M203/203PI		United States	40mm
633	HK GMG		Germany Greece	40mm/ 165 mounted on M-1114GR HMMWV.
?	M79		United States	40mm
?	Mk.19 Mod.3		United States	40mm
Anti-tank recoilless rifles
135	ACL-89 STRIM		France	89mm
1,988	M2 Carl-Gustav		Sweden Greece	84mm, with passive night vision binoculars.
?	AT4		Sweden	84mm
17,706	RPG-18 Mukha		Soviet Union	64mm
10,841	M72 LAW		United States	66mm
1,346	M67		United States	90mm, to be withdrawn.
1,291	M40A1		United States	106mm
Anti-tank guided missile launchers/ Anti-armor missiles & rockets
438	BGM-71 TOW II		United States	
400	MILAN I/II		France West Germany	Anti-tank guided missile, most MILAN I systems have been upgraded to MILAN II. At least 130 launchers equipped with MIRA type thermal goggles, while 147 equipped with MILIS type thermal goggles, 42 launchers are mounted on M-1025A2 HMMWV vehicles and the 248 on MB-240GD vehicles.
262	9K111 Fagot		Soviet Union East Germany	Anti-tank guided missile from former East Germany, 262 FAGOT anti-tank systems, caliber 125mm.
196	9M133 Kornet E		Russia	1,100 missiles/ 98 launchers mounted on M-1114GR HMMWV.
34	Spike NLOS		Israel	34 SandCat 350 vehicles with 10 launchers each (17 complete systems). Additional systems to equip 9 AH-64A attack helicopters, 4 Osprey 55 class gunboats (8 launchers each) with ~500 missiles in stock. Deliveries started in August 2025.
-	AGM-114 Hellfire		United States	Αir-to-ground, anti-armor missile used by AH-64 Apaches and OH-58 Kiowa helicopters of the Hellenic Army Aviation. Over 1,353 missiles available (AGM-114F, AGM-114K II, AGM-114M II, AGM-114L types).
-	Hydra 70		United States	Αir-to-ground, anti-materiel rockets fired from M261 launchers mounted on AH-64 Apaches and OH-58 Kiowa helicopters. 16,520 rockets acquired in 1991 and 1997.

== Land vehicles and heavy armament ==
=== Main battle tanks (1,344) ===
Greek CFE treaty limit: 1,735 (Greece suspended its partitipation in the treaty in 7 November 2023)

Quantity	Type	Images	Origin	Notes
170	Leopard 2A6 HEL		Germany Greece	120mm gun. Built under license by ELBO.
183	Leopard 2A4/GR		Germany	120mm gun. Equipped with C2 systems. 123 might be upgraded to the A7 standard.
501	Leopard 1A5/GR		Germany	105mm gun. A number might be upgraded to the Leopard1HEL variant which includes a new 1000 hp engine, a modern 105mm gun with the capability of launching barrel-launched Anti-Tank Guided Missiles (ATGMs), as well as advanced composite and slat armor.
390	M48A5 MOLF		United States	105mm gun. Equipped with EMES-18 (MOLF) fire control system (71 M48A5 tanks in storage as of 2019).
100	Μ60Α3 TTS		United States	105mm gun (up to 400 Μ60 A1/A3 tanks in storage as of 2022).

=== Armored fighting vehicles/carriers ===
Greek CFE treaty limit: 2,498 (IFVs / APCs). (Greece suspended its partitipation in the treaty in 7 November 2023)

Quantity	Type	Images	Origin	Notes
Armored infantry fighting vehicles (IFVs) (181)
40	Marder-1A3		Germany	Acquired from Germany in an exchange of 40 Greek BMP-1s with an equal number of German Marder IFVs.
141	BMP-1A1 Ost		Soviet Union Germany Greece	From the 501 BMP-1s that were ordered from Germany in 1993, around 140 BMP-1A1 Ost remained in service as of 2022. Another 44 BMP-1s were converted to ZU-23-2 carriers in Greek facilities. As of June 2022, the Greek government intended to send at least 40 BMP-1 IFVs to Ukraine as military aid. 40 vehicles have already been sent.
Armored personnel carriers (APCs) (2,478)
491	G-127 Leonidas II		Greece	Made by the Greek vehicle manufacturer ELBO, includes 90 upgraded Leonidas I.
1,995	M113A1/1E		United States	1,034 M113A1, 313 M113A1G (German variant of the M113A1) and 648 M113A2. Most equipped with a M2 Browning heavy machine gun, a number are equipped with a GMG grenade launcher. A wider modernization program is being considered, which will include upgrading the vehicles agility (engine assembly, transmission, suspensions) as well as the armor/protection of the APC.
1,995	M113A2		United States	1,034 M113A1, 313 M113A1G (German variant of the M113A1) and 648 M113A2. Most equipped with a M2 Browning heavy machine gun, a number are equipped with a GMG grenade launcher. A wider modernization program is being considered, which will include upgrading the vehicles agility (engine assembly, transmission, suspensions) as well as the armor/protection of the APC.
Armored mortar carriers (260)
257	M106A1/A2		United States	120 with E-56 EBO 120mm / 137 with M29A1 mortars.
3	M125A1		United States	Equipped with M29A1 mortar.
Armored anti-tank guided missile carriers (408)
362	M901A1/A2 ITV		United States	Armored BGM-71 TOW carrier, based on M113.
12	M113 TOW		United States	
34	SandCat 350		Israel	Carriers for the SPIKE NLOS launchers.
Armored command vehicles (322)
41	M992 FDCV		United States	Built on the chassis of the M109-series howitzer. Ammunition support vehicles turned into fire control centres.
281	M577A1/A2		United States	Armoured command vehicle, based on M113. 213 units used as command stations and 68 units used as fire control centres.
Armored patrol and reconnaissance vehicles (2,132)
681	M1025A2 HMMWV		United States Greece	~270 built in Greece by ELVO (designations M1114GR to M1119GR).
243	Panhard VBL		France	80% will be upgraded to the Ultima version. 2 vehicles have already been upgraded.
1,202	M1117 Guardian		United States	Unknown versions. 1,202 have been received as of August 2024.
46	M1059A2 SGC		United States	Delivered in 2014. Reconnaissance, smoke generator vehicle equipped with the M157A2 smoke generating system. Blocks both visual and infrared detection. Based on the chassis of the M113.
8	Typhoon MRAP GSS 300		Canada	A total of 8 Typhoon GSS-300s were confiscated at the Piraeus customs in 2015, as they were found on a ship bound for Libya, where transportation of weapons was prohibited at the time. They are now used for border patrols. 2 were given to the Special Suppressive Antiterrorist Unit (ΕΚΑΜ).
Fast attack vehicles (FAVs)
4	Polaris MRZR		United States	Used by Special Forces.
3	R-12D Flyer 1		United States	Used by Special Forces. Equipped with one FN MAG 7.62mm machine gun and a GMG 40 mm automatic grenade launcher.

=== Engineering vehicles ===
Quantity	Weapon	Images	Origin	Notes
Armored recovery vehicles
12	Leopard-2 Buffalo HEL		Germany Greece	Armoured recovery vehicle based on Leopard-2 chassis.
12	Wisent-1		Germany	Armoured recovery vehicle based on Leopard-1 chassis. On order.
43	Leopard-1 ARV		Germany	Armoured recovery vehicle based on Leopard-1 chassis (BPz-2 ARV).
95	M88A1		United States	Armored recovery vehicle of the Patton tanks family.
113	M578		United States	Armored recovery vehicle.
Armored vehicle-launched bridges
16	Leopard-1 Leguan		Germany	Armoured vehicle-launched bridge based on Leopard-1 chassis.
10	Leopard-1 Biber		Germany	Armoured vehicle-launched bridge based on Leopard-1 chassis.
22	M48A5 AVLB		United States	Armoured vehicle-launched bridge based on M48 Patton chassis.
12	M60A1 AVLB		United States	Armoured vehicle-launched bridge based on M60 chassis.
?	RIBBON Μ 812		United States	Greece has the basic version.
?	PMP KRAZ 255B		Russia	KrAZ-255B is used for transporting, launching and disengaging of PMP bridge pairs.
Μine clearance armored engineering vehicles
10	Leopard 1V MP		Germany	Leopard-1 chassis. The weapon was removed (in accordance with the Conventional Armed Forces Agreement), while Pearson Engineering added a full-width mine plow.
30	Leopard 1A3 GR		Germany	Leopard-1 chassis. The weapon was removed (in accordance with the Conventional Armed Forces Agreement). Equipped with mine rollers.
?	Μ60Α1		United States	M60 chassis. Equipped with mine rollers.
?	Giant Viper		United Kingdom	Vehicle-pulled, mine clearance system towed by M113 vehicles.
Other armored engineering vehicles
3	Leopard 1A5		Germany Greece	Armored firefighting vehicle based on Leopard-1 chassis. The turret has been replaced by a 12.5 ton water tank.

=== Logistics & Support ===
Quantity	Model	Images	Origin	Notes
Utility/Cargo vehicles
12,000	Steyr 680M		Austria Greece	Pending decision on replacement.
150	Steyr 12M18		Austria Greece	Various versions. Fuel tankers.
66	Steyr 40M60 HET		Austria Greece	
73	MTVR MK27		United States Greece	40 MK27 are fitted with medium recovery equipment supplied by Eyal of Israel. A total of 33 are fitted out as ammunition transporter vehicles to operate alongside the Hellenic Army's Leopard MBTs.
8,000	MB-240GD/-290GD		Germany Greece	A total of over 10,000 units (5500 240GD and 4500 290GD) were built at the Sindos facility by ELVO the Hellenic Vehicles Industry. It exists as a command vehicle, patrol / security units (equipped with a 7.62mm MG3 or MAG machine gun), ambulance, radio carrier, but also as a carrier of guns and anti-tank missiles (M40, MILAN, 9K111-2 Fagot, TOW). From 2022 the older ones will start to be withdrawn, with the total replacement of the fleet being placed around 2030.
?	MAGIRUS		Germany	Fuel tankers.
21	MAN TGS		Germany	Off-road dump trucks. One used as a mobile operations centre.
24+	MAN KAT1		Germany	Ιn the role of transporting ammunition, and are already in service with the two self-propelled Medium Artillery Squadrons operating with the PzH2000GR of the Hellenic Army.
120	MAN FX (Steyr 40Μ60/S40)		Austria	
93	Oshkosh M911 HET		United States	77 Oshkosh M911 HET 6×6 and 16 Oshkosh M911 HET 8×6.
60	Oshkosh M1070A1		United States	60 Oshkosh M1070A1 8x8 donated by the US in 2023.
320	HEMTT		United States	M978, M985, M977 and M987P1. They were donated by the USA in 2014.
135	M35		United States	Fuel tankers.
300	FMTV		United States	In various versions.
148	KrAZ-255B		Russia	Used for transporting, launching and disengaging of PMP bridge pairs.
?	TATRA 815 VT		Czechoslovakia	
?	FIAT IVECO		Italy	
?	DAF		Netherlands	
15	Mitsubishi L200		Japan	The new 6th generation of the L200. To strengthen border patrols.
20	Toyota Hilux		Japan	Used for border patrols.
Armored medical evacuation vehicles
54	M113 A1 Medevac		United States	
70	HMMWV		United States	M997A3 Tactical Humvee Ambulance.
?	MB-240GD/-290GD		Germany Greece	Ambulance vehicle.

=== Artillery ===
Greek CFE treaty limit: 1,920 (calibres > 100mm) (Greece suspended its partitipation in the treaty in 7 November 2023)

Quantity	Weapon	Images	Origin	Notes
Rocket artillery (152)
36	M270 MLRS		United States	12×227mm. Under a program to be upgraded since 2021.
116	RM70		Czechoslovakia	40×122mm. Currently under upgrade with the Serbian rockets G2000 to increase range.
Ballistic missiles
152	MGM-140 ATACMS		United States	153 MGM-140A ATACMS Block 1 missiles were acquired from 1996 to 1998.
Self-propelled artillery (589)
24	PzH 2000GR		Germany	155mm howitzer.
420	M109		United States Germany	155mm howitzer. 51 M-109 A1Β, 84 M-109 A2, 273 M-109 A3G, 12 M-109 A5.
145	M110 A2		United States	203mm howitzer. In 1984 a number of M107 self-propelled guns were upgraded to M110 A2 in Greece. 60 have been sold to Ukraine. Still in service due to the large stock of ammunition available. 60 have been sold to Ukraine.
Towed artillery (698)
266	Μ114Α1/Α2		United States	155mm howitzer, in storage/service as of 2016. more than 70 have been sold to Ukraine.
413	M101Α1		United States	105mm howitzer, in storage/service.
19	OTO Melara Mod 56		Italy	105mm pack howitzer.
Counter-battery radar/Observation systems
18	AN/TPQ-36/37p		United States	The latest version of the AN / TPQ-36 is the (v) 10 with improved performance, higher computing power, lower operating costs and an increased maximum detection range of at least 50%.
3	ARTHUR		Sweden	Arthur is a lightweight, highly mobile weapon locating system (WLS), tactically deployed close to the forward line of own troops. Arthur is in currently operational in twelve countries, among them Norway, Sweden, the Czech Republic, South Korea, Spain, Italy, Greece and the UK.
3	Kasta 2E1		Russia	
1	Vaisala RT 20 AM		Finland	Weather station with radiosonde receiver.

=== Signals Corps ===
Quantity	Weapon	Images	Origin	Notes
Surveillance systems
10	Stentor		France	Thomson-CSF "Stentor" battlefield radar is designed to detect, recognize, and locate moving targets such as infantry, ground vehicles, helicopters, low-flying aircraft, and boats.
20	BOR-A 550		France	The radar BOR-A-550 is a land and coastal surveillance radar (GSR) suitable for military use in coastal and land border surveillance operations. Combines ground, sea and low flying target surveillance automatically classifying them day and night under any weather conditions. Mounted on M1114GR vehicles.
10	MSP-350 MARGOT XXL		France	Electronic surveillance system mounted on M-1118-2GR HMMWV.

=== Air defence systems ===
Weapon	Quantity	Image	Origin	Notes
Air defense - missile systems
MIM-23B Hawk	42		United States	Phase III (Improved Hawk). 7 batteries × 6 missile launchers each. Medium range.
9K33 Osa AK/AKM	39		Russia	7 batteries, 39 systems, 6 missile launchers on each vehicle. Each system includes four 9A33BM3 launch vehicles, one 9T217BM2 reloading vehicle with a 12 round stock, one 9V210M3 technical support vehicle, one 9F372M3 maintenance vehicle, one 9V914 vehicle with adjustment equipment, one automatic control and test station 9V242-1 and 9F16M2S collection equipment. OSA-AKM systems also feature an IFF antenna. 12 systems donated by Germany in 1993, another 20 bought from Russia in 1998 and finally 7 more acquired as an offset for the sale of the TOR M-1 system to Greece in 2004.
TOR M-1	21		Russia	21 systems, each systems comprised by 4 vehicles, 84 missile launchers each- Hellenic Army (Additional 4 systems with 16 missile launchers under HAF).
ASRAD-HELLAS	54		Germany Greece	With 432 FIM-92 Stinger Block 1 missiles. VSHORADS.
FIM-92 Stinger	631		United States	MANPADS. Up to 664 launchers with 3,572 missiles available.
Air defense - gun systems
ZU-23-2	506		Soviet Union	2×23×152mm.
Mk20 RH-202	285		Germany	2×20×139mm (Another 326 operated by HAF and 183 by the Navy).
M1-L/60	227		Sweden	Bofors 40mm gun. In storage, withdrawn from active service since 2005. More in use by the Navy.
Artemis 30	17		Greece	2×30×173mm (Another 38 under the Air Force and 5 by the Navy).

== Watercraft ==
Special Forces Watercraft
Type	Image	Origin	Variant	Quantity	Notes
VIKING Norsafe Munin		Greece	S1200 Armored S1200 Tactical	41 1	On order. Deliveries have started as of December 2023. Produced locally by VIKING Norsafe Hellas. Each boat can carry 12 personnel and 2 crew members. To be used by Amphibious Raider Squadrons of the 1st Raider-Paratrooper Brigade.
Magna 960RIB		Greece	Mk I Mk II Mk IV	18 21 2	The majority of the boats were delivered to the Amphibious Special Forces, while a small number are placed at the Special Forces Training Center in Nea Peramos for training purposes. Seven Magna 960RIB Mk II boats were acquired to transport infantry teams on islands as direct intervention teams. To be eventually phased out of active service.
Rafnar 1100		Greece	Cabin Bulletproof	3	Built by Rafnar Maritime for the Special forces and the Hellenic Coast Guard.
Oceanic Stealth		Greece	120AB	3	The first 2 Oceanic Stealth 120ABs were acquired through a donation from shipowner Athanasios Martinos, with the third vessel delivered in 2020.
Escape 38		Greece	Escape 38 Military	2	Donated by the Greek company Escape24.
VICTA		United Kingdom Greece		6	Six craft to be used by the Hellenic Special Forces, another four will be used by the Hellenic Navy. Contract signed July 2026, first ship delivered by October 2026 (two to be built in UK, and the remaining eight at Skaramangas Shipyards).

== Aircraft ==
Aircraft	Image	Origin	Type	Variant	Quantity	Notes
Attack/Scout Helicopters
Boeing AH-64 Apache		United States	Attack helicopter	AH-64A+ AH-64D	19 9	Israel has agreed in April 2023 to upgrade Greek AH-64As. Deliveries started in November 2025.
Bell OH-58 Kiowa		United States	Armed reconnaissance helicopter	OH-58D	60	Ex-US Army helicopters. Another 10 are used as an alternative source of spare parts. Fitted with a Greek active protection system.
Transport/Utility Helicopters
Boeing CH-47 Chinook		United States	Transport helicopter	CH-47D CH-47DG CH-47SD	10 9 6	Greece has sent a LoR for the acquisition of 10 CH-47F helicopters and the upgrade of another 10 CH-47Ds.
UH-60 Black Hawk		United States	Transport helicopter	UH-60M	35	An order has been placed for 35 Blackhawk M variant in April 2024 for $1.24 billion.
NHI NH90		Europe	Transport helicopter	NH-90 TTH	20	For special forces usage. Might be eventually replaced with UH-60M helicopters.
Bell 205		United States	Transport helicopter	UH-1H ΑB-205A	26 74	To be partially phased out of active service and replaced by UH-60M helicopters.
Bell 206		United States Italy	Utility helicopter	AB 206 Jet Ranger III	14	
Bell 212		United States Italy	Staff transport helicopter	AB 212 VIP	1	
Training Helicopters
Schweizer S300		United States	Training helicopter	NH300C	15	
Reconnaissance/Utility Aircraft
Beechcraft C-12 Huron		United States	Photo-reconnaissance Staff transport	C-12C/R	3	The C-12C is used for VIP transport and was upgraded with more powerful engines. The two newer C-12R serve the Hellenic Military Geographical Service, doing aerial photography missions.
Cessna 185 Skywagon II		United States	Utility airplane	U-17A/B	10	Some remain operational, having undergone a partial modernization of communications systems and an engine replacement.
Reconnaissance/Surveillance Drones
SAGEM Sperwer		France	Reconnaissance/ artillery guidance	B	16	4 systems with 4 UAVs each. Operated by Signals Corps.
Aeronautics Defense Orbiter		Israel	Reconnaissance/ artillery guidance	Orbiter 3	17	
Shield AI V - BAT		United States	Surveillance & intelligence	MQ-35A	4	2 systems, entered service in May 2025. Will be primarily used for border control. Donated by the Laskaridis Foundation.
AeroVironment RQ-20 Puma		United States	Surveillance & intelligence	RQ-20B Puma II	?	An unknown number of systems were supplied by the US to Greece. Might be used by special forces.
Matrice 300		PRC	Surveillance & control	RTK	?	Made by DJI. Used by special forces on the border.
Safran Patroller		France	Reconnaissance/ intelligence		4	Delivered in Fall 2026
EMPUSA Χ6		Greece	Surveillance & control	EMP-X6T (Tactical)	1	Made by S.A.S. Used by the 1st Raider–Paratrooper Brigade.
ATLAS 204		Greece	Surveillance & control	204	32	
Ucandrone Mera		Greece	Surveillance & control		?	
Helion X		Greece	Surveillance & control		?	
Loitering munitions
Aeronautics Defense Orbiter		Israel	Kamikaze drone	Orbiter 1K	?	A considerable number of Orbiter 1K drones has been purchased as of November 2024.
FPV 306		Greece	FPV Drone		?	
Arpyia		Greece	One-way attack drone		?	

== Future procurements/projects ==
Quantity	Weapon	Image	Origin	Notes
Future Weapons
123	Leopard 2A7		Germany Greece	123 Leopard 2A4 will be upgraded to the A7 standard, ~190 Leopard 1A5 could also be upgraded as part of the program.
205	KF41 Lynx		Germany Greece	The Hellenic Army General Staff has now officially expressed interest in the KF-41 Lynx Infantry Fighting Vehicle. They may be manufactured in Greece through technology transfer. As of November 2025, the German offer includes 205 vehicles alongside 200 Marder 1 A3 IFVs.
TBC	Stryker		United States	Potential sale to replace M113 and Leonidas announced in October 2026.
370	VBCI		France Greece	Possible sale of 350-370 vehicles. The French offer includes the immediate delivery to the Greek Army of about 120 second-hand VBCIs from the stock of the French Army and the acquisition of 200 PHILOCTETES AMCs with co-production in Greece. The offer also includes the acquisition of an additional 50 specialized vehicles covering the need for command stations, fire control centres, MEDEVAC vehicles and ARVs. In April 2025, it was announced that the vehicle will be produced in Greece by Metlen in the Greek town of Volos. 250 new vehicles will be produced in Greece and 120 used vehicles will come from French stocks.
36	PULS (multiple rocket launcher)		Israel	The Hellenic Army will acquire 36 systems of the European version, EURO PULS MLRS, in a deal of €650 ($750) million, signed in April 2026, with the construction of some of the components in Greece. The plan includes the acquisition of Accular, EXTRA, and primarily Predator Hawk rockets. The deal will also include SkyStriker UAV/loitering munitions, according to media reports from January 2025. The launchers will most-likely be vehicle-mounted on Iveco trucks, similar to the ones Germany used for the system. It will also integrate the RM-70 rockets already in service with the Hellenic Army. The delivery will make Greece the largest foreign operator of the system.
TBD	RM-70 Vampire		Czechia	Up to 116 RM-70 multiple rocket launchers could be upgraded by Excalibur Army to the Vampire variant.
100	SPIKE SR		Israel	The Hellenic National Defence General Staff has approved the activation of a program to purchase 100 SPIKE SR anti-tank missiles through the NATO Support and Procurement Agency (NSPA).
TBD	Akeron MP		France Greece	MBDA in collaboration with Greek companies Miltech and ALTUS LSA will work on projects to develop systems based on the company’s Akeron MP mounted on the new UAV ATLAS 8 HEAVY LIFTER. May be purchased for use on the VBCI.
590	AeroVironment Switchblade		United States	The program includes the acquisition of 390 Switchblade 300 UAVs with 50 ground control stations as well as 200 Switchblade 600 UAVs with 26 ground control stations to counter enemy tanks.

- Majority of these plans are under review to be accepted or denied by the Hellenic defence ministry and Hellenic national staff.

== See also ==
- List of equipment of the Cypriot National Guard
- List of active Hellenic Navy ships
- List of decommissioned ships of the Hellenic Navy
- List of aircraft of the Hellenic Air Force
- List of historic aircraft of the Hellenic Air Force
- List of former equipment of the Hellenic Armed Forces
