= List of equipment of the Cypriot National Guard =

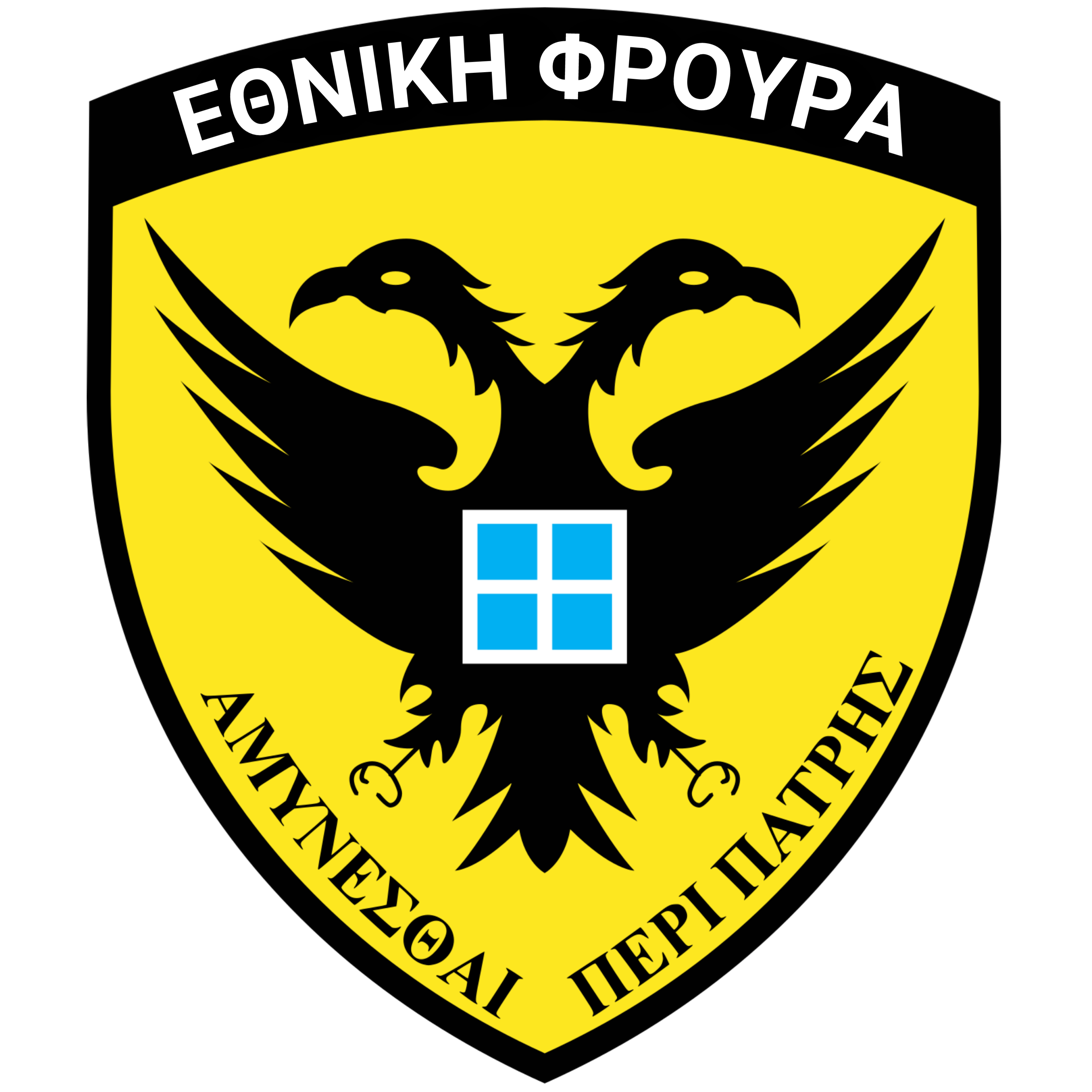
Emblem of the National Guard of Cyprus.

The Cypriot National Guard is a combined arms force and represents the organised air, land and sea capabilities of the Republic of Cyprus. Equipment is mostly imported from other countries, since the country has very limited heavy industrial and commercial industrial capacity due to its small population and land mass.

This list contains equipment which is in use by the Cypriot National Guard.

== Infantry Equipment ==
=== Gears ===
Model	Type	Photo	Details
OR-200	Combat helmet		Not in service
PASGT	Combat helmet		Standard issue
MICH	Combat helmet		Used by special force

=== Camouflages ===
Model	Origin	Type	Photo	Details
Camouflage
Multicam	United States	Camouflage pattern		Standard issue
Woodland Digital	United States	Camouflage pattern		Unused since 2017
UCP	United States	Camouflage pattern		(Retired at an unknown date)
Cypriot Sandstone	Cyprus	Camouflage pattern		Being phased out
Greek Lizard	Greece	Camouflage pattern		Used by ELDYK

=== Small Arms ===
Model	Origin	Cartridge		Photo	Notes
Handguns
HK USP	Germany	9x19mm Parabellum			Standard Issue Sidearm.
FN Five-Seven	Belgium	FN 5.7×28mm			250 acquired in 2000.
Glock 17 Gen 3	Austria	9x19mm Parabellum			Used by LOK and MYK.
Submachine guns
FN P90	Belgium	FN 5.7×28mm			350 acquired in 2000.
H&K MP5	Germany	9x19mm Parabellum			Small number used by military police and MYK. Most likely MP5A3 and MP5A5 version
Assault rifles
HK G3	West Germany; Greece	7.62×51mm NATO			Standard Issue Rifle. The versions operated by the National Guard are mainly the G3A3 and G3A4 (shown in the picture, the upper one is the G3A4 and the lower one is the G3A3).
AK-74M	Russia	5.45×39mm			AK-74M version in use by the National Guard.
Vz.58	Czechoslovakia	7.62×39mm			Used for a brief period of time by the Special Forces in 2016. Partially in use by Military Police.
Colt M16A2	United States	5.56×45mm NATO			Used by MYK.
Colt M5	United States	5.56×45mm NATO			11.5 inch barrel length. Entered service in 2024, used by MYK. Also in use by the MIAU of the Cyprus Police.
FN SCAR-L	Belgium	5.56×45mm NATO			Used by LOK and MYK.
FN SCAR-H (TPR Variant)	Belgium	7.62×51mm NATO			Used by LOK and MYK.
IWI Tavor X95	Israel	5.56×45mm NATO			Both 330mm and 419mm barrel length versions. Used by LOK and MYK.
Sniper rifles
Accuracy International Arctic Warfare	United Kingdom	.338 Lapua Magnum			AXMC variant used by the Special Forces.
Accuracy International AX50	United Kingdom	.50 BMG			Used by the Special Forces.
FN Model 30-11	Belgium	7.62×51mm NATO			
Machine guns
MG 3	West Germany; Greece	7.62×51mm NATO			Large number in service.
HK21	Germany	7.62×51mm NATO			A variation of the HK G3 with a heavier barrel. Made by EAS.
FN MAG	Belgium	7.62×51mm NATO			
IWI Negev	Israel	5.56×45mm NATO			Negev SF and Negev NG-7 SF versions. Used by mechanised infantry, paratroopers and LOK. Equipped with red dot and thermal sights.
IWI Negev	Israel	7.62×51mm NATO			Negev SF and Negev NG-7 SF versions. Used by mechanised infantry, paratroopers and LOK. Equipped with red dot and thermal sights.
FN MINIMI	Belgium	5.56×45mm NATO			Minimi Mk2 Para TR version.
M2 Browning	United States	.50 BMG			
Grenade launchers
STK 40 AGL	Singapore	40 mm grenade			Mounted on vehicles and on small arms.
M203 grenade launcher	USA	40 mm grenade			
Anti-tank weapons
M72 LAW	United States	Rocket-propelled grenade	66mm		
RPG-7V	Russia	Rocket-propelled grenade	85mm		~1000 in service. Produced in country since 2025.
M40A1	United States	Recoilless rifle	105mm		144 M40A1s as of 2016.
RAC 112 APILAS	France	Recoilless anti-tank weapon	112mm		~1000 in service.
9M117 Bastion	Russia	Anti-tank guided missile	100mm		Line-of-sight, beam-riding missile (LOSBR) fired from the BMP-3 IFV. 700 missiles delivered in 1996.
9M117 Refleks	Russia	Anti-tank guided missile	125mm		Fired from the 125mm main gun of the T80U and T80UK main battle tanks of the National Guard.
MILAN III	France	Anti-tank guided missile	115mm		More than 1250 missiles.
SPIKE LR2	Israel; Germany	Anti-tank guided missile	130mm		Fitted on LAPV Enok (single launcher). 5,5 km range.
AKERON MP	France	Anti-tank guided missile	140mm		Fitted on Sherpa Light.(single launcher).
Euromissile Mephisto	France	Anti-tank guided missile	150mm		Delivered in 1988 for use on Gazelle helicopters and VAB-VCAC. ~500 missiles.

== Land Forces ==
=== Transport, Logistics and Support ===
Model	Origin	Photo	Quantity	Notes
Utility/Cargo vehicles
MAN FX (Steyr)	Austria			Multi-role. Used to transport personnel, tanks, anti-aircraft systems and howitzers.
Steyr 1491	Austria			
Mobile FPV Production Facility (Steyr 1491)	Cyprus			Designed to produce FPV Drones for ground forces
MAN RMMV TG MIL	Germany			Several Variants. Commonly used to transport the TRF1 towed howitzers and personnel.
Mercedes-Benz Sprinter	Germany			Mainly used as Mobile Communication Centers and military Ambulances. Can support satellite communications and high-speed data transfer.
Iveco Daily	Italy			Used to transport personnel. (Third generation 2014)
Steyr-Puch Pinzgauer	Austria			Some carrying Mistral Manpads (Atlas System) and some others carrying mobile FPV launchers .
Renault TRM 10000	France			Used to transport and support the MM40 Exocet anti-ship missiles of the Navy Command.
Mercedes-Benz G-Class	Germany			
ACMAT VLRA	France			Some used to carry the MO-120-RT mortars.
Mitsubishi L200	Japan		125	
Ford Ranger Double Cab XL	USA		60	2,0 L diesel 170 hp engine.
Isuzu D-Max Double	Japan		60	
Mitsubishi Pajero	Japan			Transferred from Cyprus Police.
CFMOTO U-10 PRO	China			Used by Special Forces (LOK)

=== Armoured vehicles ===
Model	Origin	Photo	Variant	Quantity	Notes
Main battle tanks
T-80	Russia	Cypriot T80U	T-80U	54	A total of 82 main battle tanks acquired between 1996 and 2011. May be replaced by Leclerc or Leopard 2.
T-80	Russia	Cypriot T80U	T-80UK	28	A total of 82 main battle tanks acquired between 1996 and 2011. May be replaced by Leclerc or Leopard 2.
AMX-30	France		AMX-30B2	52	Another 61 AMX-30s have been withdrawn from active service and are waiting to be scrapped; some will be kept for museums. To be replaced.
Infantry fighting vehicles (IFVs)
BMP-3	Russia		BMP-3 (Basic Version)	43	Deal worth $68 million, and delivered in 1995–1996.
Armored reconnaissance vehicles
EE-9 Cascavel	Brazil		Cascavel Mk IV/V	126	Entered service from 1984 to 1988. It has a top speed of 80 km/h off-road and 110 km/h on-road. It is armed with a 90 mm Belgian Cockerill Mk 3 gun, improved day and night optics with laser rangefinder, and a 12.7 mm anti-aircraft MG.
EE-3 Jararaca	Brazil		EE-3 Tank destroyer	36	Entered service from 1984 to 1985, 24 are armed with a MILAN ATGM system. The vehicle has a 3-man crew with a top speed of 100 km/h and is armed with 1 x 20-mm Rh202 autocannon, and 1 x 12.7mm machine gun.
Armoured personnel carriers (APCs)
ELVO Leonidas	Greece	Greek Leonidas-2 APC	Leonidas-2	197	Based on the Austrian Saurer 4K 4FA. Some fitted with E44-E Mortars.
VAB	France		VAB-PC	4	A total of 147 vehicles are operated by the National Guard. The VAB VCAC variant is equipped with the Euromissile Mephisto anti-tank missile system. (See infantry weapons above.) The VAB VCI is fitted with a turret mounted 20 mm gun. Some may by upgraded in the future by Arquus.
VAB	France		VAB-VTT	98	A total of 147 vehicles are operated by the National Guard. The VAB VCAC variant is equipped with the Euromissile Mephisto anti-tank missile system. (See infantry weapons above.) The VAB VCI is fitted with a turret mounted 20 mm gun. Some may by upgraded in the future by Arquus.
VAB	France		VAB VCI	27	A total of 147 vehicles are operated by the National Guard. The VAB VCAC variant is equipped with the Euromissile Mephisto anti-tank missile system. (See infantry weapons above.) The VAB VCI is fitted with a turret mounted 20 mm gun. Some may by upgraded in the future by Arquus.
VAB	France		VAB VCAC	18	A total of 147 vehicles are operated by the National Guard. The VAB VCAC variant is equipped with the Euromissile Mephisto anti-tank missile system. (See infantry weapons above.) The VAB VCI is fitted with a turret mounted 20 mm gun. Some may by upgraded in the future by Arquus.
EE-11 Urutu	Brazil		Unknown	10	Received in 1984. Status uncertain.
Mine-Resistant Ambush Protected Vehicles (MRAPs)
BOV M16 Miloš	Serbia		Artillery reconnaissance – command vehicle	8	Part of a $50 mil. deal that included Nora B-52. Delivered in 2019. The 8 BOV M16 are used as artillery reconnaissance and battery command vehicles for the 24 Nora B-52 self-propelled howitzers of the National Guard.
Armored recovery vehicles (ARVs)
BREM-80	Russia		BREM-80U	8	Based on the T-80 chassis.
AMX-30	France		AMX-30D	2	
Anti-Tank Guided Missile Vehicle
Euromissile Mephisto	France			18	18 systems. Mounted on the 18 VAB VCAC APCs of the National Guard with four ready-to-fire HOT-2 anti-tank missiles and eight more in reserve, 500 missiles.
LAPV Enok	Germany		ENOK 4.8 AB	1 + 59 on order	Armed with Spike LR2 missiles. First displayed to the public in October 2025.
Sherpa Light	France			12	Station Wagon version ordered in May 2025. Armed with Akeron MP missile. Possible additional armament consists of 12,7mm machine gun and 40mm grenade launcher.
Land Rover Wolf W/ MILAN	France / United Kingdom			?	Multiple systems of MILAN mounted on Land Rover Defender Wolfs. Significant Numbers, exact numbers unknown. 115 mm, Tandem shaped charge with 2 km max range.

=== Artillery ===
Model	Origin	Type	Photo	Number	Notes
Rocket artillery
LRSVM Tamnava	Serbia	122mm and 262mm self-propelled multiple rocket launcher		6	First displayed to the public in October 2025. 2 rocket pods ready to fire and another 2 in reserve. 24 122mm (40km) rockets or 6 262mm (70km) rockets in each pod.
M-63 Plamen	Yugoslavia	128mm towed multiple rocket launcher		24	Acquired (reportedly) 24 towed pieces in the early 1980s from former Yugoslavia.
M-77 Oganj	Yugoslavia	128mm self-propelled multiple rocket launcher		8	Status uncertain.
BM-21 Grad	Russia	122mm self-propelled multiple rocket launcher		4	Probably second hand. To be phased out.
Self-propelled artillery
Nora B-52	Serbia	155mm self-propelled howitzer		24	First batch received in 2019.
Zuzana	Slovakia	155mm self-propelled howitzer		12	Ordered in 2001 and delivered in 2007 via Greece.
Mk F3 155mm	France	155mm self-propelled howitzer		12	Delivered in 1991.
M107	United States	175mm self-propelled howitzer		12	
M110A2	United States	203mm self-propelled howitzer		8	
Tatrapan	Slovakia	Artillery command vehicle		3	Artillery command and control centres for the Zuzana howitzers.
AMX-VCI	France	Artillery command vehicle		Unknown	
Towed artillery
M-56	Yugoslavia	105mm towed howitzer		72	Delivered in 1986.
M1944 BS-3	Soviet Union	100mm towed gun		20	
M-114	United States	155mm towed howitzer		12	
TRF1	France	155mm towed howitzer	French 155 mm TRF1 Towed Artillery	12	Delivered in 1991.
Mortars
E44-E Mortar	Greece	81mm mortar		180	Some carried on Leonidas APCs.
M29 Mortar	United States	81mm mortar		Unknown	In use as of 2000.
M30 Mortar	United States	106,7mm mortar		26	To be fully retired.
MO-120-RT	France	120mm mortar	120 mm Mortar	116	Delivered in 1990–1991. 12 equipped on mortar carriers, carried by ACMAT VLRA. 8,1 km range with standard projectiles.

== Airforce ==
=== Air defense ===
Name	Origin	Type	Photo	In service	Notes
Early warning RADARs
TRS-2215D	France				Used by the 4th ΚΕΠ.
TRS-2245MT	France				Used by the 4th ΚΕΠ.
EL/M-2084	Israel	Multi-mission radar & fire control guidance			Used for early warning and providing fire control guidance for the BARAK MX.
Surface-to-air missiles
Barak MX	Israel	Surface-to-air missile system		Possibly 3 batteries.	In operation as of December 2024. Most likely: 3 batteries consisting of 4 launchers each. Maximum range 150km.
Aspide	Italy	Surface to air missile system		24	6 batteries/130 missiles. Utilized with the Skyguard system (Othellos) using Oerlikon GDF 35mm. 12 Skyguard radars.
Mistral	France	Man-portable air defense system	Cypriot SHORAD	30 (300 missiles)	18 Mistral MANPADS and 12 x2 Mistral ATLAS system mounted on Pinzgauer utility vehicles. More than 300 missiles. More missile on order as of June 2023.
TOR M-1	Soviet Union Russia	Surface to air missile system		6	Delivered by Greece in replacement for the S-300.~150 missiles.
Buk M1-2	Soviet Union Russia	Surface to air missile system		8	Total number of systems is unknown. Possibly 2 batteries with 4 systems each.
9K32 Strela-2	Soviet Union Russia	Man-portable air defense system		100	Operational numbers may be less. Withdrawn from active service.
9S737M Ranzhir-M	Russia	Mobile command center		Unknown	Mobile Command Centre for the coordination of the TOR air defense network system
Anti aircraft artillery
GDF-005	Switzerland	Anti-aircraft gun		24	2x35mm anti-aircraft gun. Part of the Skyguard (Othellos) system along Aspide SAMs.
Zastava M-55	Yugoslavia	Anti-aircraft gun		90	3x20mm anti-aircraft gun.

=== Aircraft ===
Aircraft	Origin	Type	Photo	Variant	In service	Notes
Fixed wing aircraft
Embraer ERJ-135	Brazil	VIP Transport		EMB-135BJ	1	Donated by Greece to Cyprus in September 2022. The aircraft is used to transport the President of the Republic and other government officials.
Air Tractor AT-802	United States	Fire-fighting			2	Transferred in February 2025 from the Department of Forests to the newly created fire-fighting unit of the National Guard. 3,1 ton water tank capacity.
Helicopters
Airbus H145	France; Germany	Armed Reconnaissance Helicopter		H145M	5	Another 1 on order with an option to buy an additional 6. First 4 delivered in 2025. Equipped with the HForce weapons system. Carrying 12,7mm machine gun and 12 rocket pot. It may also carry Spike ER2 missiles in the future.
Aérospatiale Gazelle	France	Utility/Anti-tank		Gazelle SA 342L	4	Armed with 4 HOT Anti-tank Guided Missiles.
AgustaWestland AW139	Italy	SAR/Utility		AW139	3	Used primarily for Search and Rescue (SAR) in coordination with JRCC Larnaca.
Bell 206	United States	Utility/ Transport		LongRanger III	2	Three acquired from Belgian source in the 1980s. One lost in crash in 2003.
Unmanned aerial vehicles
Aerostar	Israel	Surveillance/ Recon			4	In service since 2019. +4 on order.
IAI Searcher	Israel	Surveillance/ Recon			2	
Swarmly Poseidon H-10	Cyprus	Surveillance/ Recon/ VTOL			10	Used by the artillery Brigade for recon and target designation. Entered service 2025.

Retired aircraft include the Mil Mi-35P.

== Naval Forces ==
=== Surface defense ===
Name	Origin	Type	Photo	In service	Notes
Surface-to-surface missiles
MM40 Exocet	France	Mobile surface-to-surface missile		3 batteries.	Block 3+ modernization, part of $250 million order, bought alongside Mistral 3.

=== Surface Ships ===
Class	Origin	Vessel Type	Photo	Name	In service	Length	Notes
Surface Fleet
Al Mumbrukah	United Kingdom	Offshore Patrol Vessel (OPV)		"Alasia"	1	62m	Gift from the Sultan of Oman, refitted for military purposes in 2017.
Saar 62	Israel	Offshore Patrol Vessel (OPV)		"Andreas Ioannides", "Captain Lambros Lambrou"	1 (1 on order)	62m	One of the newest ships of the NG. Another ordered in October 2026. Both will possibly be armed with spike missiles in the future.
Rodman 55	Spain	Fast Assault boat		"Agathos" "Panagos"	2	17m	Acquired from Spain in 2002. Used by MYK.
RIB 42' SF	Italy	Fast Assault boat		"Nireas 1" "Poseidonas 1 "	2	13m	Used by MYK.
FPB C382	Italy	Fast Patrol Boat		"Eleftherios Tsomakis" "Nikolas Georgiou"	2	27m	Another 2 in service with the Cyprus Port and Marine Police.
Esterel	France	Fast Patrol Boat		"Salamis"	1	32m	Oldest active ship in the National Guard naval forces. Heavily upgraded.
FPB 26M	Finland	Multitask Patrol Boat		"Ammochostos"	1	26m	Donated from the ministry of agriculture.

== Future Procurements ==
In the last decade, the Cypriot National Guard has pushed for a complete modernization of its capabilities and equipment. In light of the recent lifting of the US imposed embargo of the '80s in 2022, Cyprus has started showing interest on multiple Western weapon systems. Cyprus also being a part of the European Union which means it is part of defensive programs involving other European nations.

Name	Origin	Type	Photo	Number	Expected Arrival	Notes
VBMR Griffon	France	MRAP		80		The National Guard is reportedly considering the purchase of 80 vehicles from KDNS. May be fitted with Akeron MP anti-tank missiles made by MBDA.
VBMR-L Serval	France	IMV/APC		100		The National Guard is reportedly considering the purchase of 100 vehicles from KDNS.
Saar 62	Israel	Offshore Patrol Vessel		1	N/A	Second ship ordered in October 2026. Both will possibly be armed with spike missiles in the future.
Airbus H145	France / Germany	Armed Reconnaissance Helicopter		6 (+6 option)	First batch 2024	Ordered in 2021. 5 delivered as of early 2025.
MARSEUS	France; Belgium; Sweden; Cyprus	Beyond Line of sight missile		Unknown	Unknown	PESCO project between multiple European nations coordinated by France to develop a new Beyond line of Sight missile system, Testing of the system was conducted in Cyprus in the summer of 2022.
Merkava Tanks	Israel	Main Battle Tank		Unknown	Unknown	Following the previous talks on purchasing used Merkava tanks from Israel which stopped following the Oct 2023 Israeli - Hamas war, Cypriot delegation to Greece found the Greek option "not good enough even for a temporary solution". Recent reports confirm that Cyprus again desires purchasing Merkava tanks from Israel though no specific details were published detailing the generation of the Tank (Mk3 / Mk4) and if used or new.

== Gallery ==
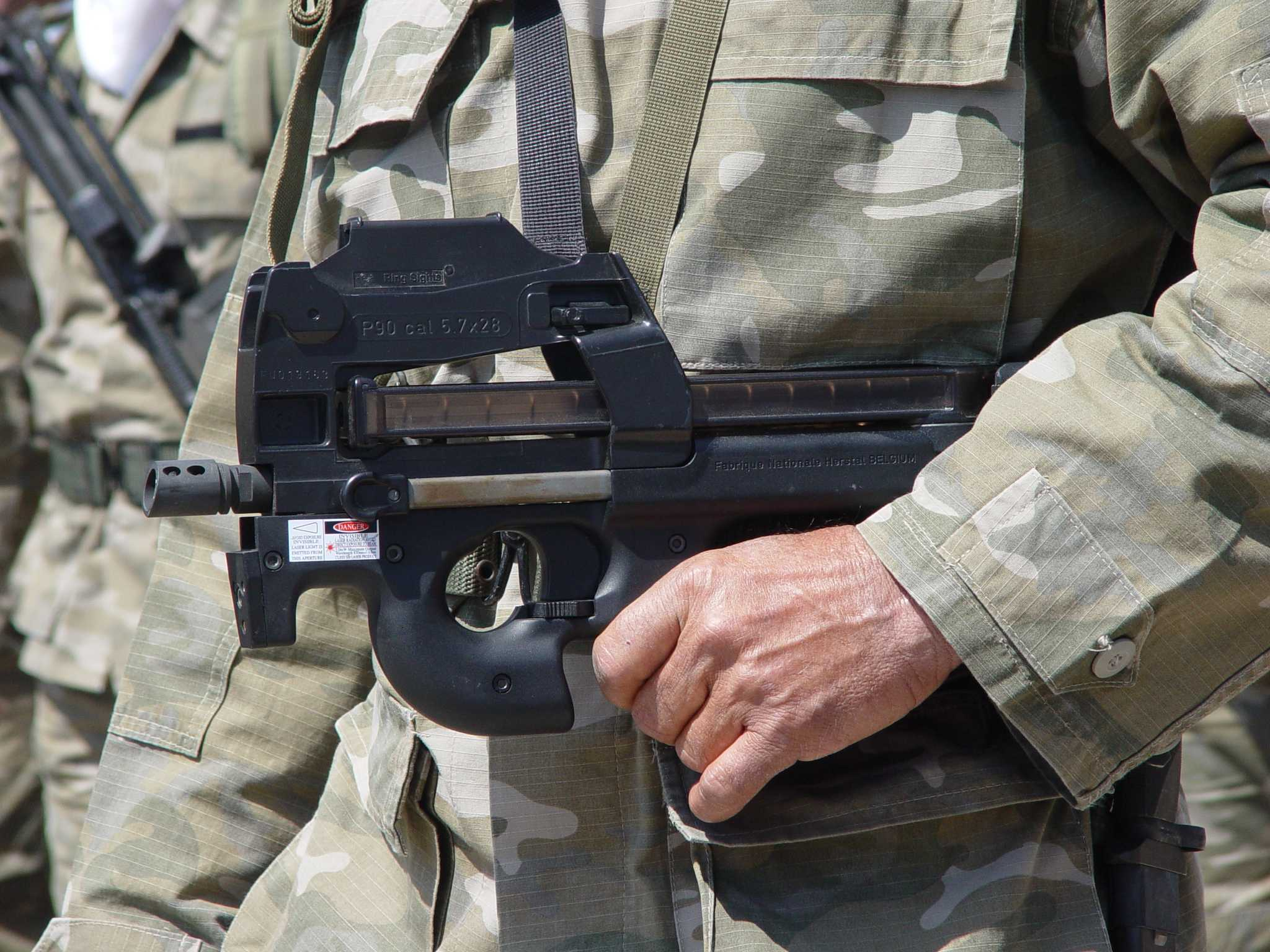
FN P90 submachine gun in the hands of the National Guard during a parade in Larnaca.

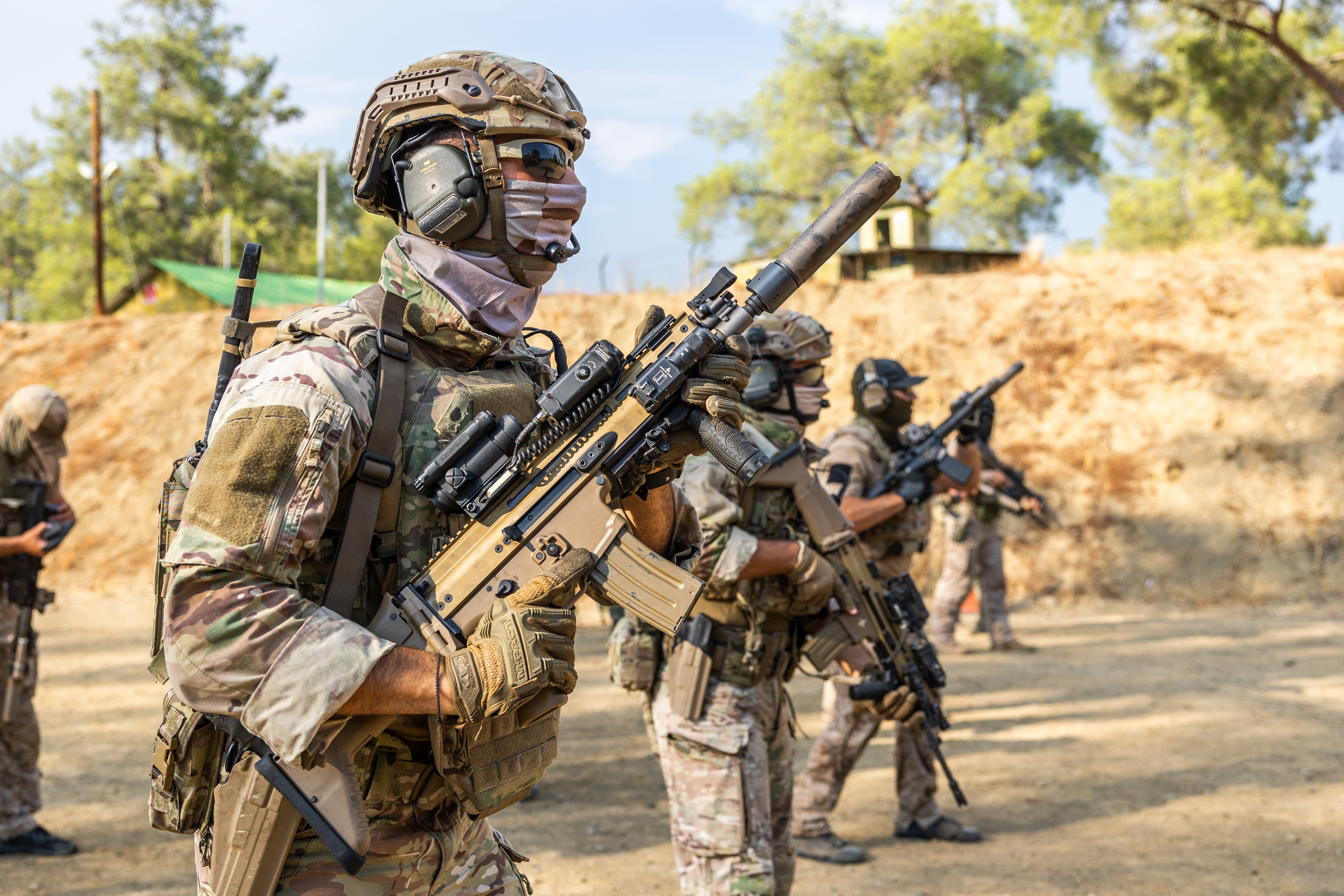
Soldiers of the Special Forces armed with FN SCAR-L assault rifles.

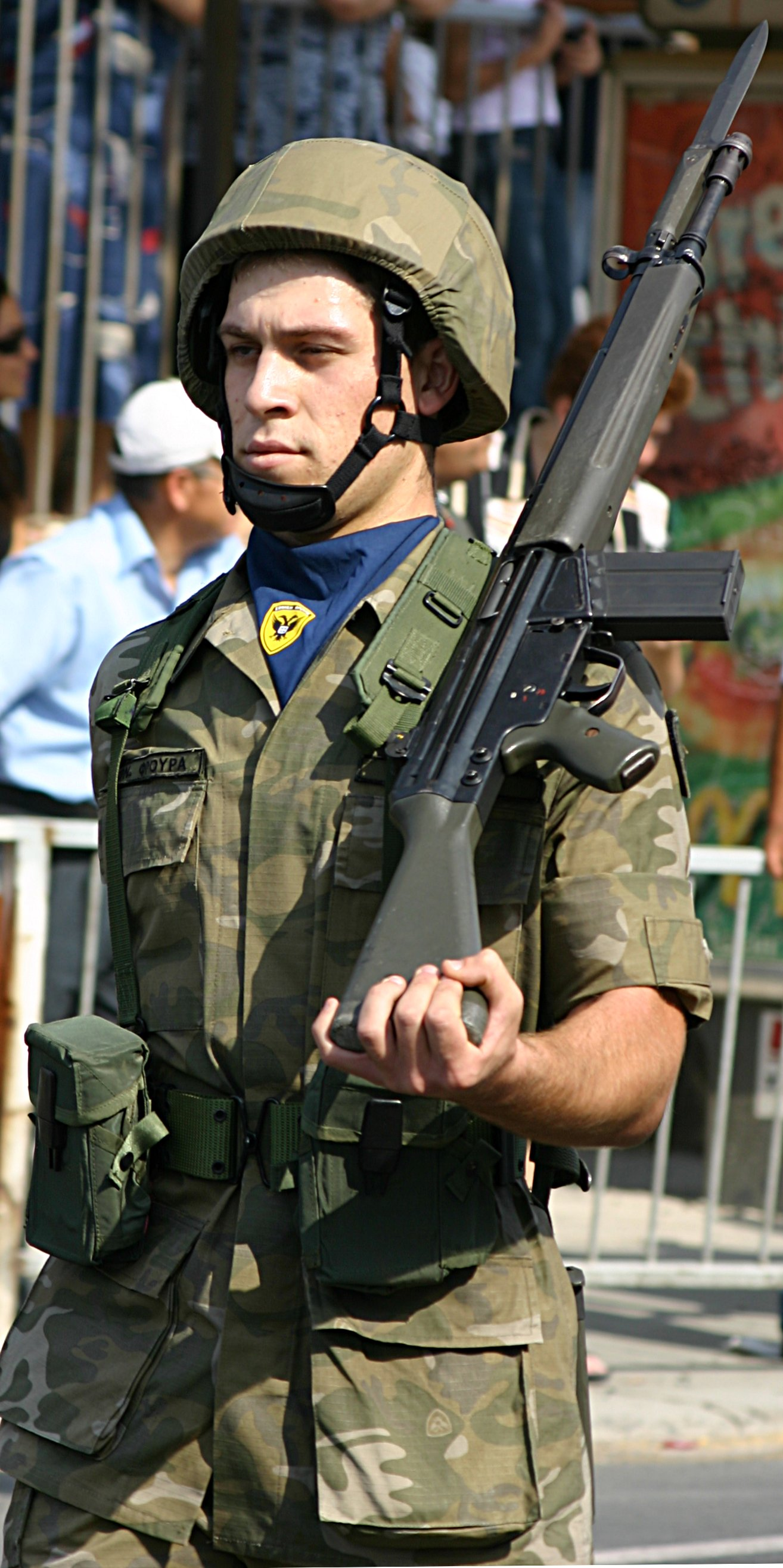
A National Guard soldier standing still with a G3A3 rifle.

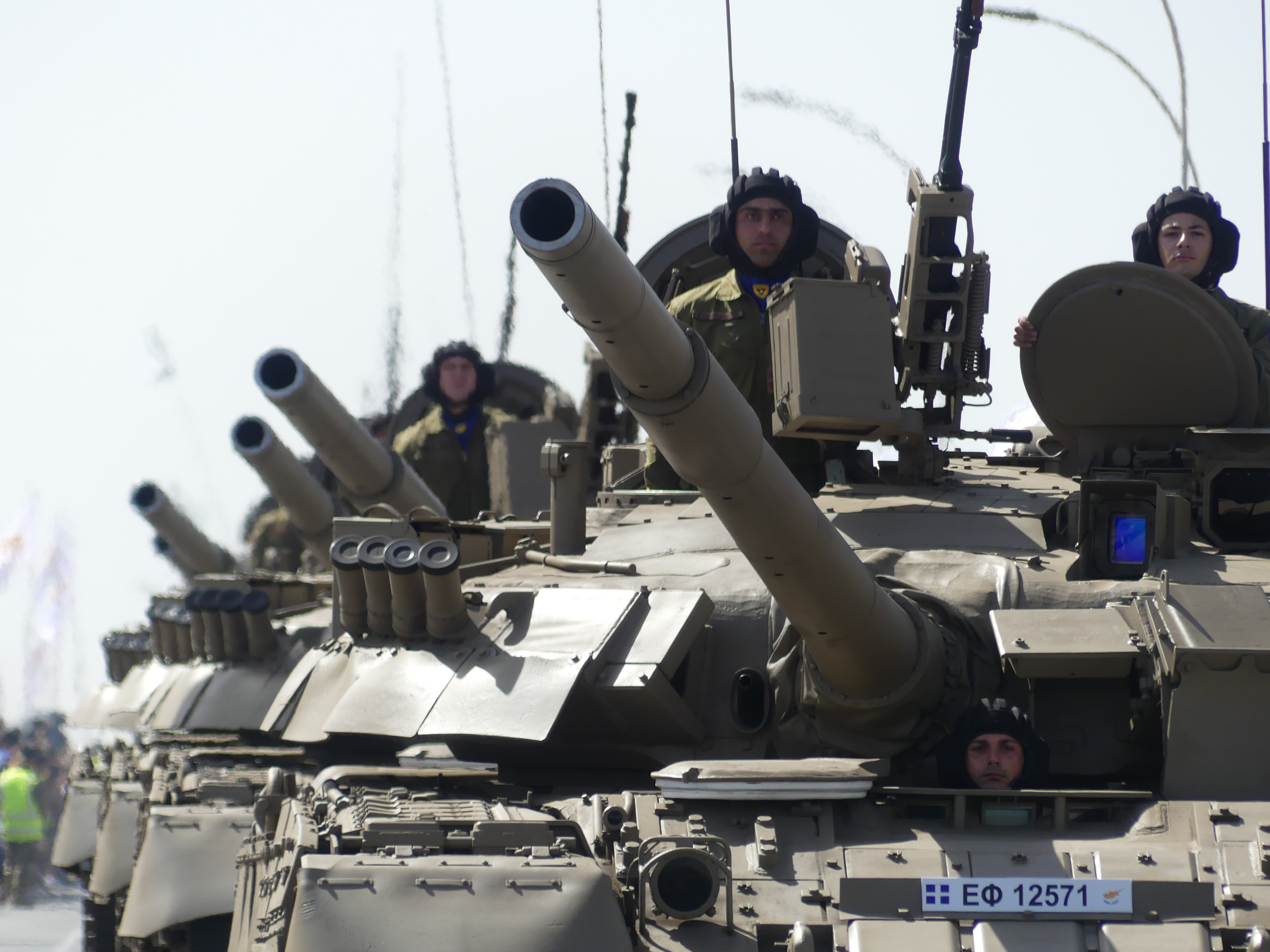
Cypriot T-80 main battle tanks during the October 1st parade in Nicosia.

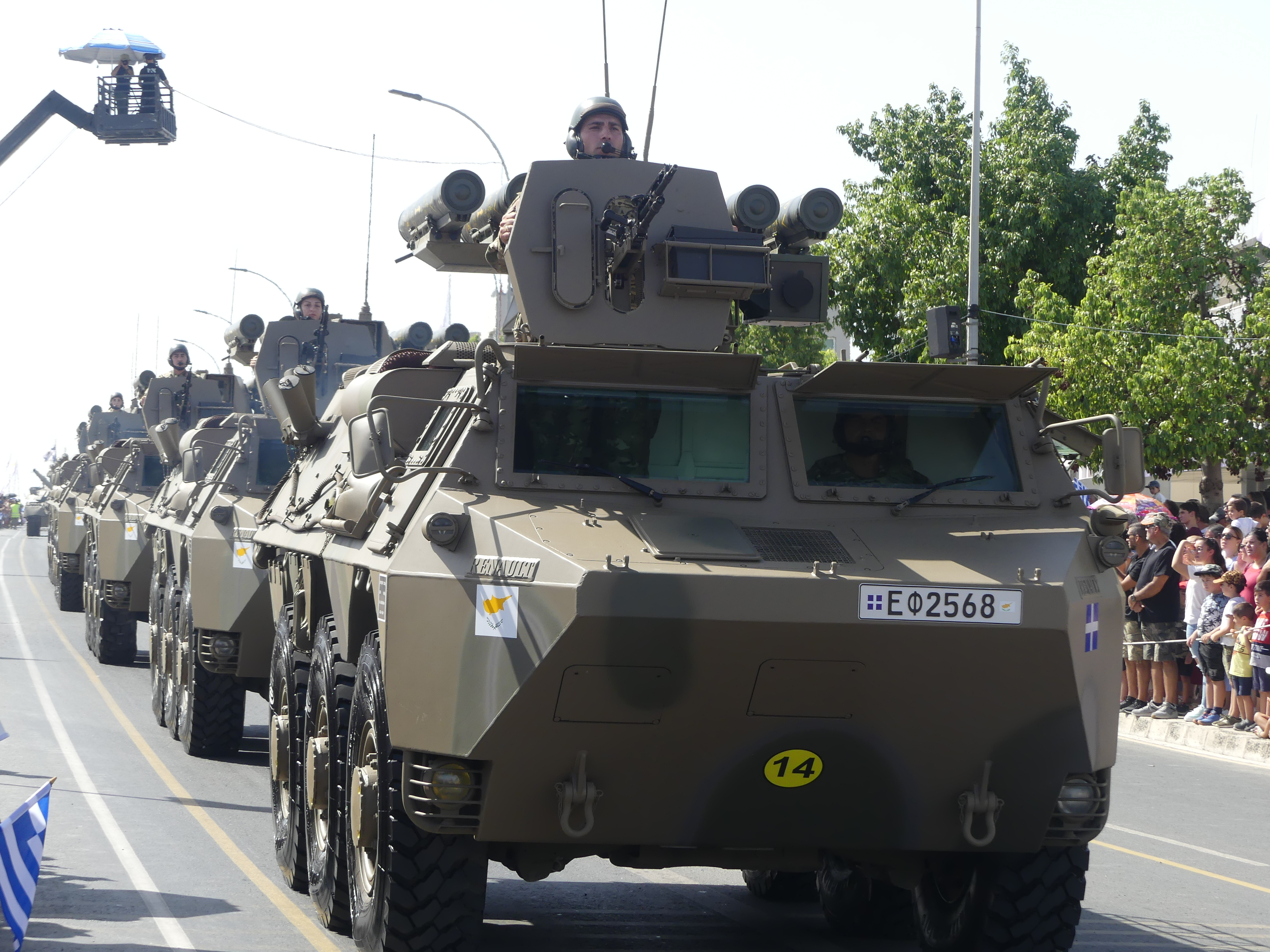
Cypriot VAB-VCAC armored personnel carriers.

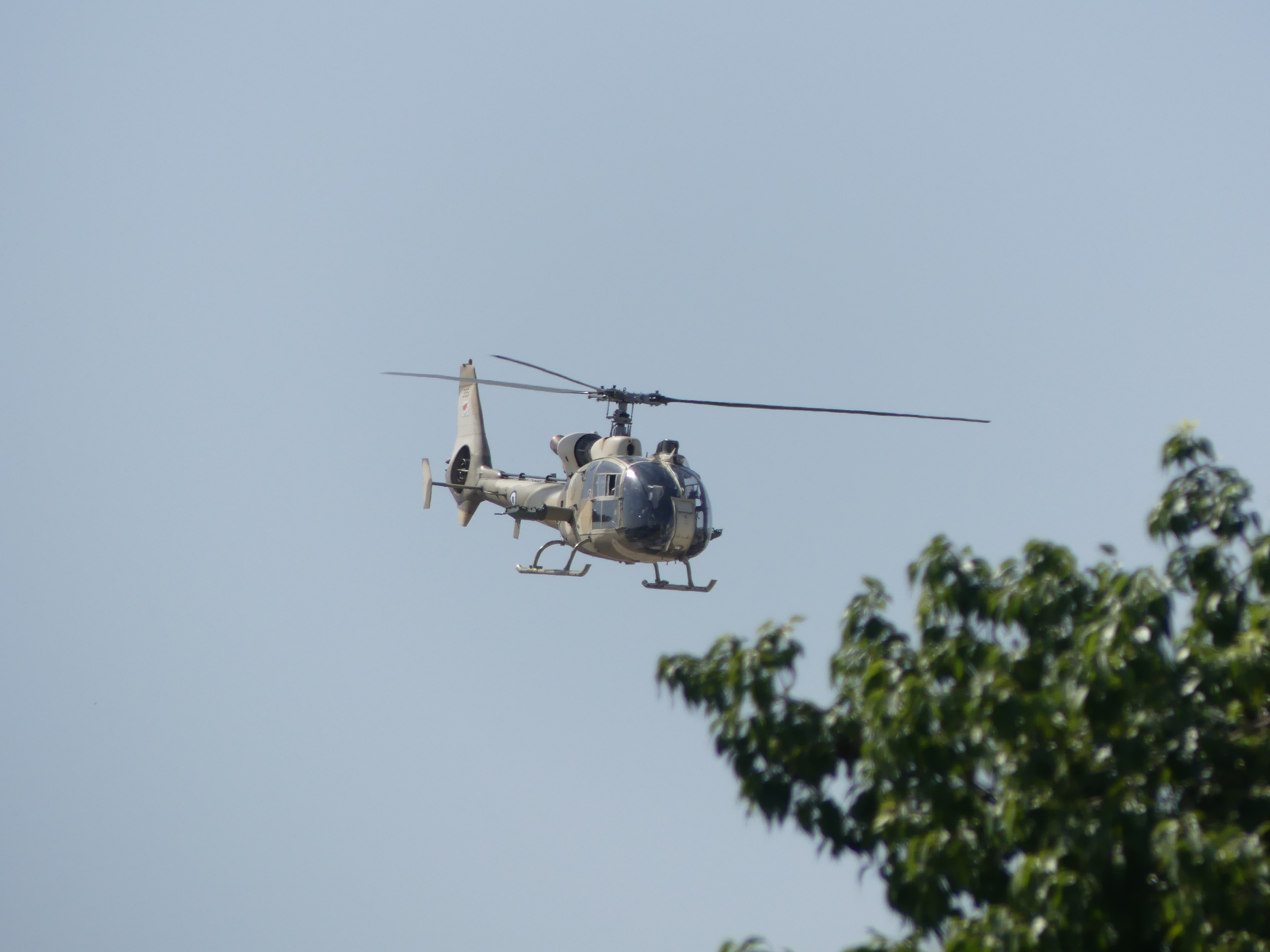
A National Guard's Aérospatiale Gazelle anti-tank helicopter flying during a parade.

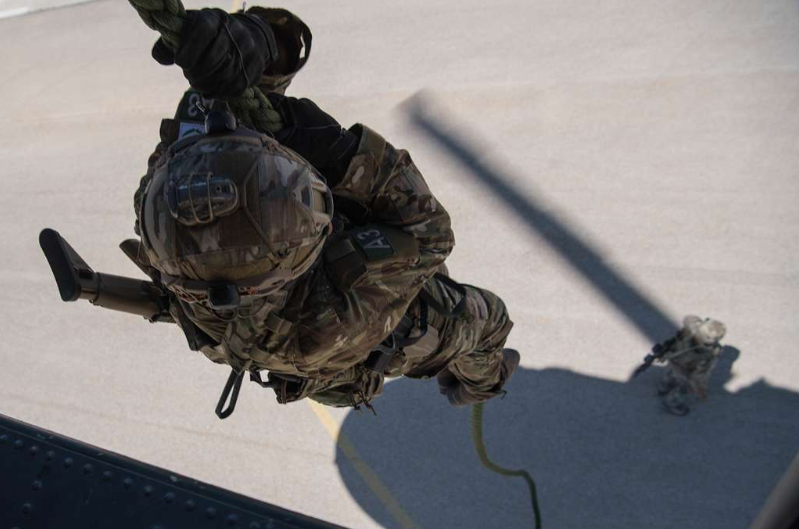
Special Forces fast roping down a helicopter.

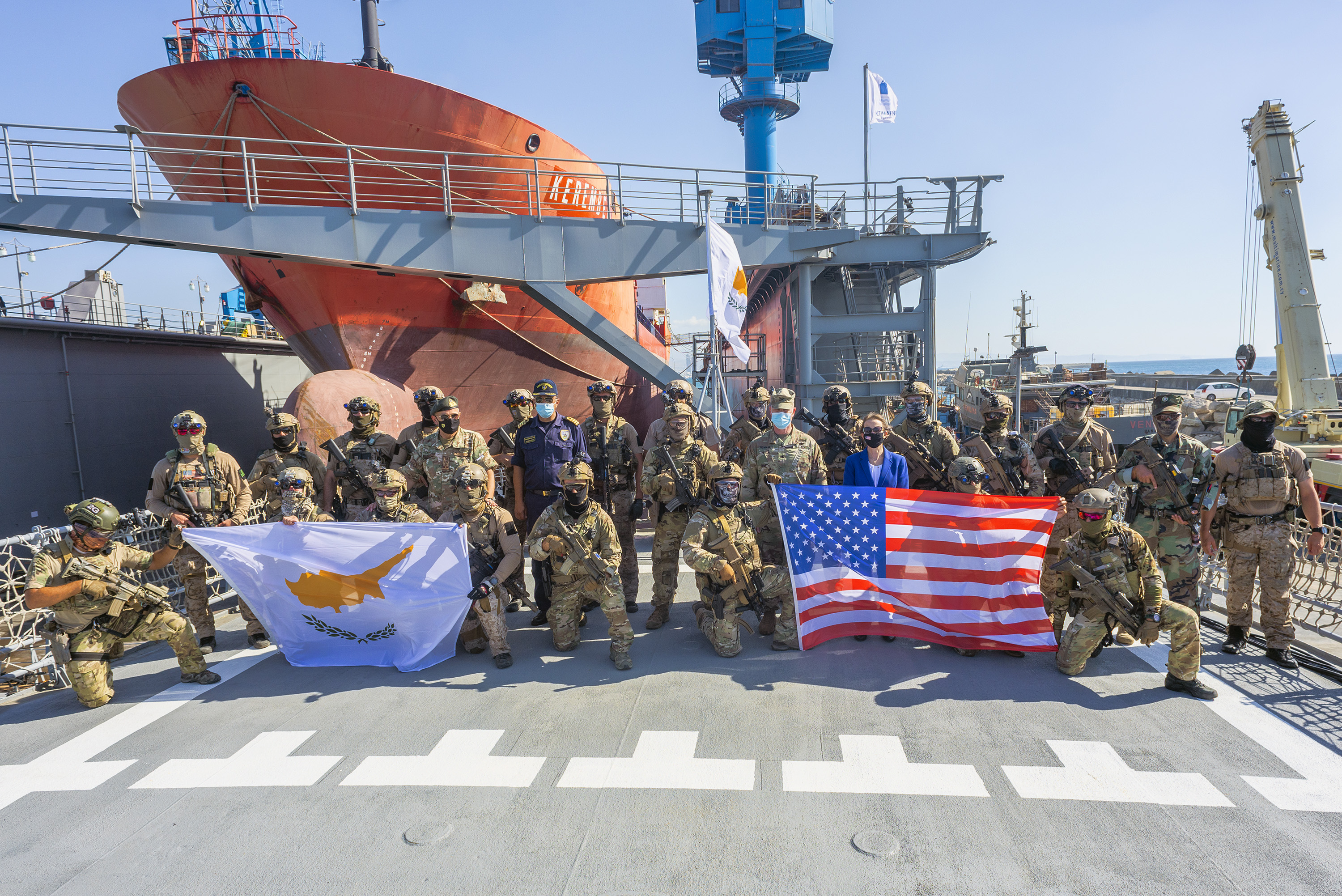
Cypriot Special forces joint training on board the "Alasia" vessel.

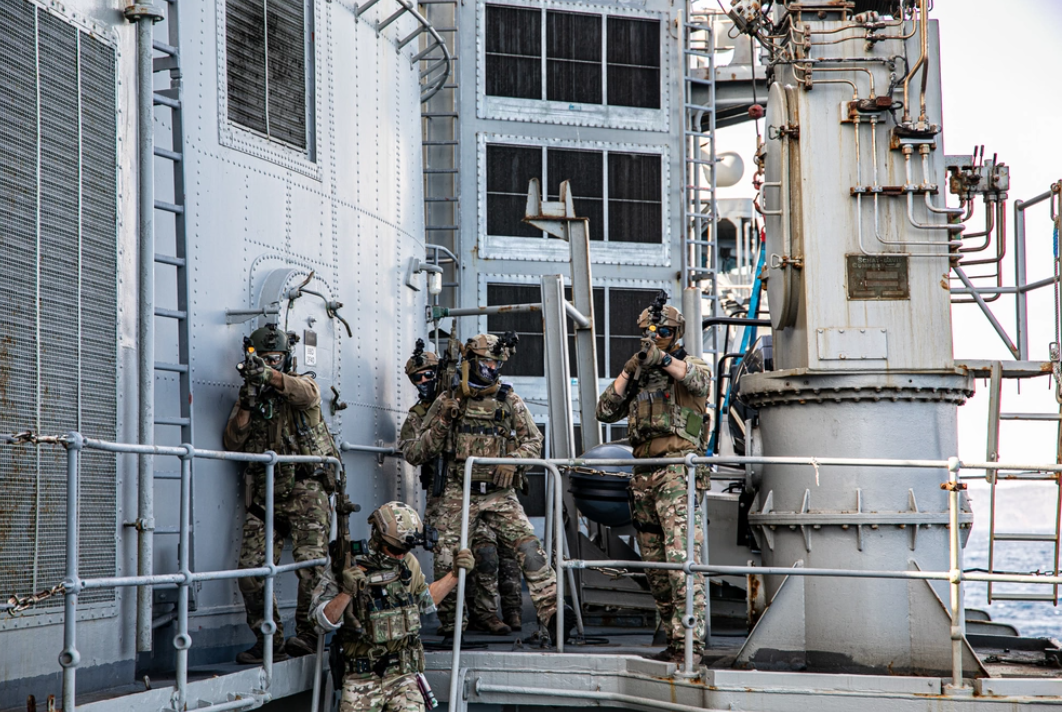
Cypriot Underwater demolition team "MYK" in joint training with Greek counterparts.

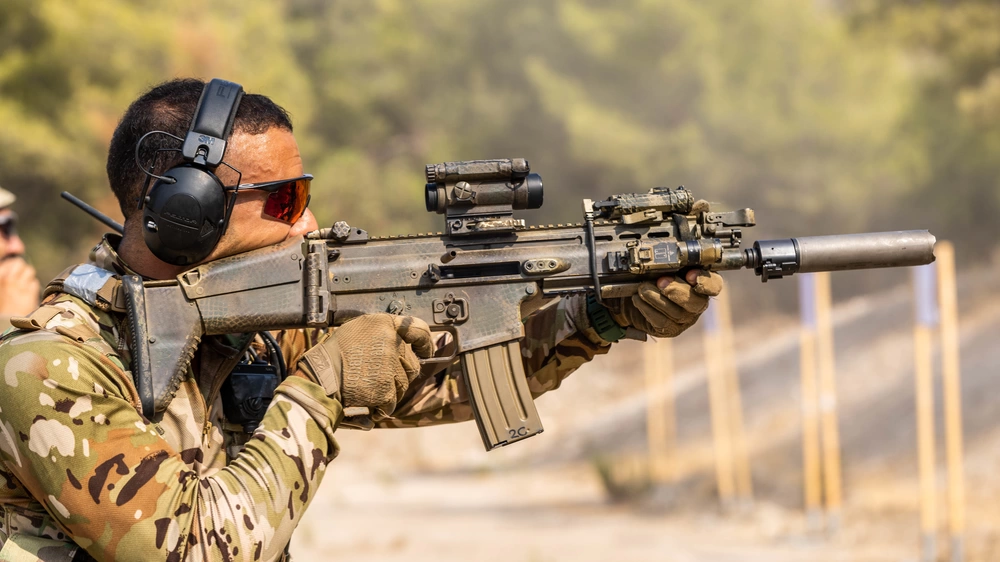
Cypriot MYK operator with an FN SCAR.

== See also ==
- Military operations during the Turkish invasion of Cyprus
- Turkish invasion of Cyprus
- Armoured vehicles of the Cypriot National Guard
- Cyprus Navy
- Cyprus Air Forces
