= ASRAD-R =

German-Swedish short-range air defense system

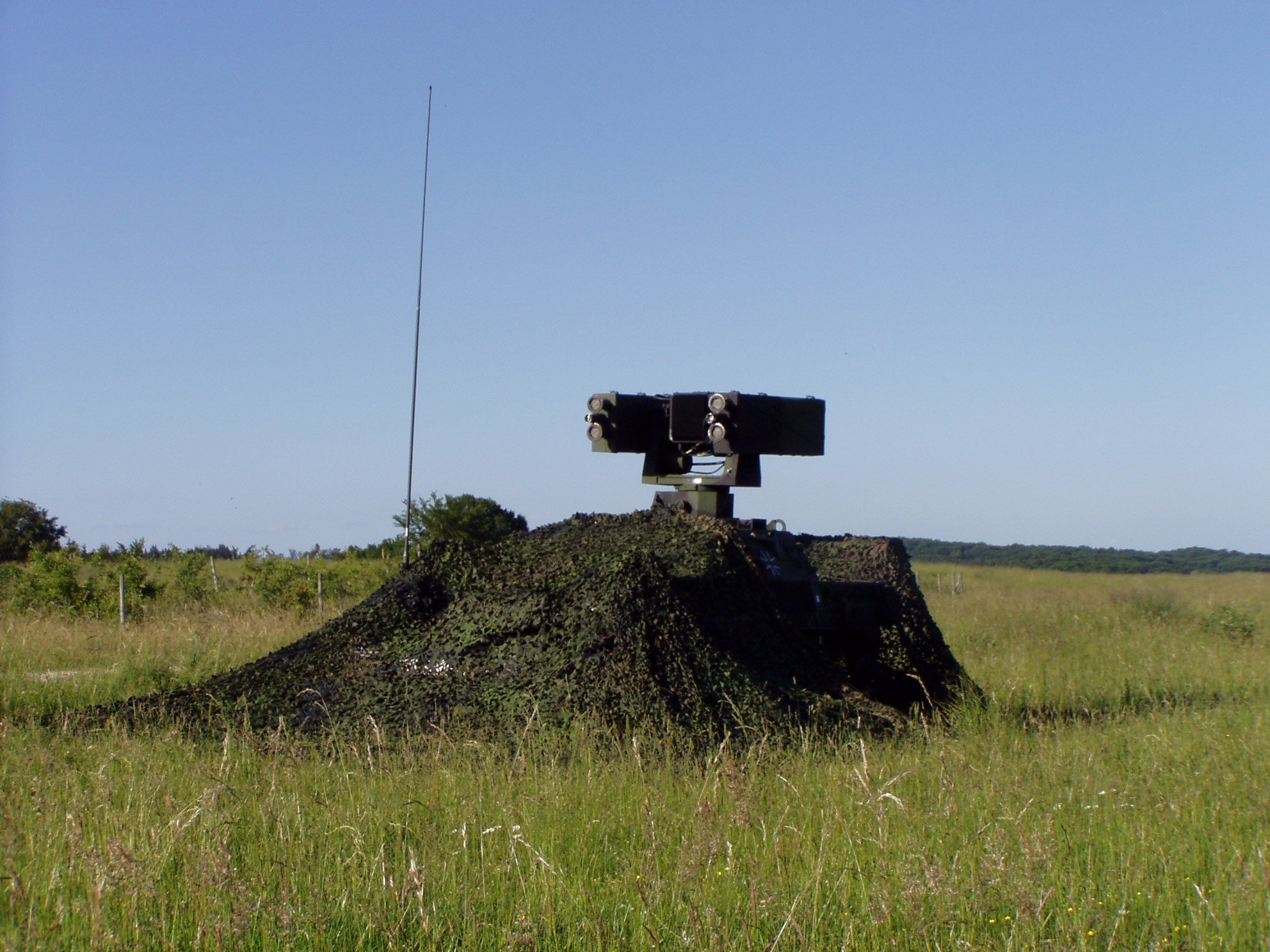
Ozelot

ASRAD-R (Advanced Short Range Air Defence System - RBS) is a vehicle-mounted short-range air defense system, designed by a joint German-Swedish effort between Rheinmetall and Saab Bofors Dynamics. The system is modular and can be mounted on almost any wheeled or tracked vehicle. It has, for instance, been demonstrated mounted on an M113 armoured personnel carrier.

Normally the same vehicle carries both the main sensor and the main effector of the system. However, thanks to the systems modularity, it can also be delivered in a split configuration with one vehicle carrying the main sensor and several other vehicles carrying the missiles.

The main sensor is Saab's (formerly Ericsson Microwave System) HARD AESA air search 3D radar with an instrumented range of 20 km or an Infra-red search and track, depending upon the customer's specifications. The effector is the latest version of the Saab Bofors Dynamics RBS 70 surface-to-air missile, called Bolide. The missile is a laser guidance beam riding short range missile equipped with a highly effective proximity fuze. It is supposed to be effective against cruise missiles.

Each unit is equipped with four ready-to-fire missiles and an optical day and night sight to continually point the laser beam at the target. This means the system makes use of ACLOS type of guidance. Since the laser receiver is located at the back of the missile the system is practically immune to jamming but the method can be hampered by very low-visibility atmospheric conditions.

Finland placed the first order in August 2002. The Finnish systems are mounted on Sisu Nasus (four units) and Mercedes-Benz Unimog 5000 L/38 4x4s (12 units). Each battery also has four RBS 70 MANPADS launchers with Bolide missiles. The first deliveries of these units were made in 2004. By 2011 the German Army had acquired 50 ASRAD-R units.

== Specifications ==
- Ceiling: 5,000 m
- Max range: 8,000 m
- Max weight: 900 kg
- Min range: 200 m

== Operators ==
- Finland - designated ItO 2005. 16 vehicle mounted units, some MANPADS units, which equals four batteries (one each for the three rapid reaction forces, and one for the capital area, as a complement for other SAM systems).

== See also ==
- LeFlaSys Ozelot, variant used by the German Army
- ASRAD-HELLAS, variant used by the Greek Army
