= Aris IV =

EBO - ARIS IV
- Type: One-use (AT & AP)
- Place of origin: Greece

Service history
- In service: Hellenic Army (canceled)

Production history
- Designed: 1984
- Manufacturer: EBO
- Produced: 1987 (canceled)

Specifications
- Mass: 7.5 kg (17 lb)
- Caliber: 113 mm (4.4 in)
- Effective firing range: 330 m (360 yd)
- Maximum firing range: 400 m (440 yd)
- Sights: yes (optical)

ARIS IV (Anti-tank Rocket Infantry System, also referred to as Aris) was a portable one-shot 113 mm (4.4 in) anti-tank weapon, built in Greece and designed by the Hellenic Arms Industry (EBO) in 1984. It had a maximum range of 400 m (440 yd) and penetration capability 700 mm (28 in) of steel. Lighter versions (anti-personnel etc.) had also been developed. In addition, it utilised locally developed composite parts, in an effort to reduce the overall weight.
