= ASRAD-HELLAS =

ASRAD Hellas
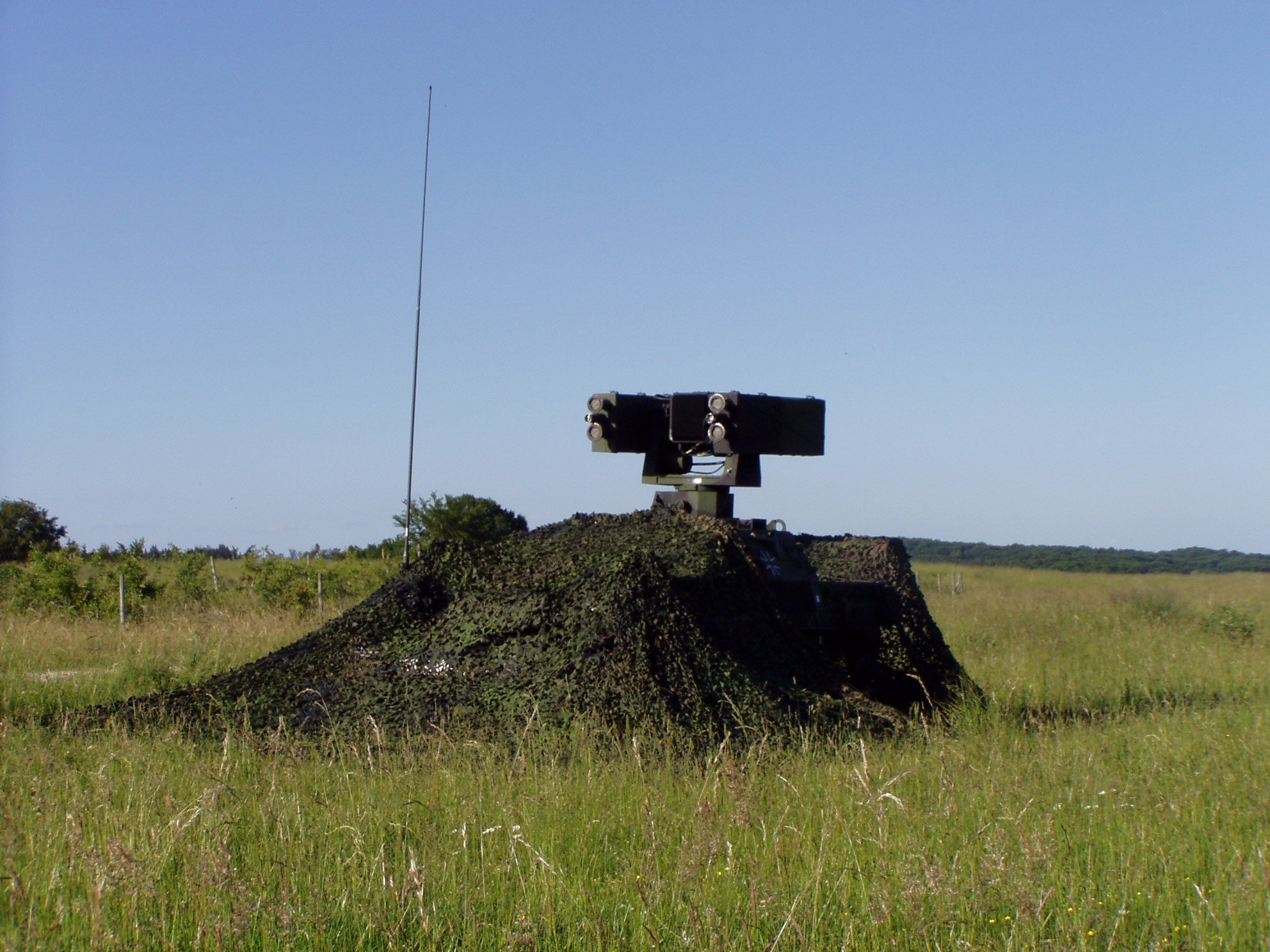
- Type: Advanced short-range air defence system
- Place of origin: Germany

Specifications
- Crew: 2
- Main armament: Stinger

ASRAD Hellas is an advanced short range air defense system developed by Rheinmetall. The Greek army has acquired 54 vehicle-mounted STINGER ASRAD Hellas (German design, with participation of Greek companies in the construction, including EBO, Intracom Defense and ELVO). The ASRAD Hellas is configured to enable reliable target detection, identification, and engagement during day or night under all possible conditions of visibility and weather. Due to its modularity and flexibility, the ASRAD Hellas fire unit embodies significant growth potential, permitting it to operate with passive and active surveillance sensors such as infrared search and track devices, and external surveillance 2D or 3D radars. The system is operated by a two-man team, composed of a weapons operator and a driver.

== Advantages ==
Advantages of the system include:

- Fast deployment (less than five minutes after unloading, e.g. from a helicopter)
- Fast reaction (no more than 10 seconds)
- Reliable multi-target capability
- High operational availability
- Automatic system operation mode (limitation of human errors)
- Ease of operation, training and maintenance
- Automatic system test (built-in test equipment/BITE)
- Stationary defense (fixed assets, area defense, remote control mode)
- Mobile defense (convoys, task forces, maneuvering elements)
- Cooperative logistics among user nations
- Large growth potential due to the modular system concept

== Additional information ==
For integrated system operations during national and international missions, the ASRAD Hellas can be equipped with additional C3I interface software for network-enabled operations and links to upper echelon allied operation centers. The system can be deployed in either stationary or mobile mode. Limitations of the STINGER missile with respect to pitch and roll acceleration on the move have had to be taken into account. During stationary operation the control and display unit (CDU) can be separated from the vehicle and connected to the system by a cable for remote operation. The maximum distance for remote control is 100 metres. Germany and Finland use similar systems.

== See also ==
- LeFlaSys Ozelot, variant for the German army
- ASRAD-R, variant for the Finnish army
