= Hellenic Arms Industry =

Greek arms manufacturer

- Native name: Greek: Ελληνική Βιομηχανία Όπλων
- Romanized name: Elliniki Viomichania Oplon
- Industry: Defense
- Founded: 1977; 49 years ago
- Defunct: 2004; 22 years ago
- Fate: Merged with Pyrkal
- Successor: Hellenic Defence Systems
- Headquarters: Athens, Greece
- Products: Weapons systems
- Number of employees: 1,300

The Hellenic Arms Industry (Greek: Ελληνική Βιομηχανία Όπλων, Elliniki Viomichania Oplon, abbreviated EBO) is the main arms manufacturer of Greece. Its creation is linked to a desire of Greek governments for "complete self-sufficiency" of Greece in the areas of personal and other weapons.

It produces rifles (military and civilian) and machine guns, as well as pistols, mortars, ammunition and explosives, rocket launchers, land mines, grenades, anti-aircraft weapons, various types of bombs, cannons, night vision equipment, aircraft metal parts, as well as specialized machinery, tools, uniforms, body armor vests and reinforced composite/plastics.

The company is a weapons exporter.

== History ==
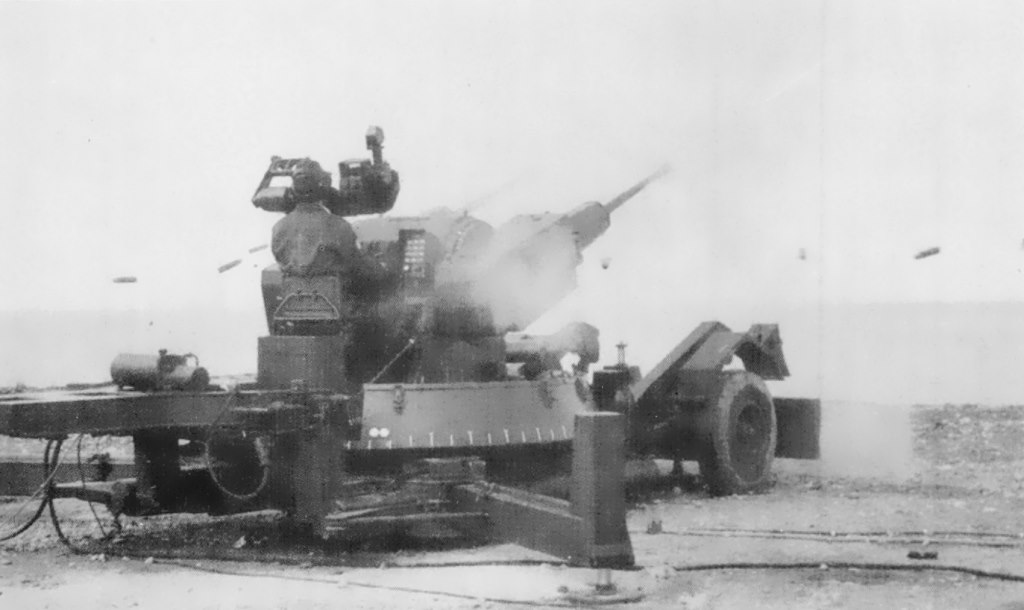
Artemis 30

A proposal in 1975 by a big Greek chemical company, Chropei of Piraeus, for the adoption of its rifles and submachine guns was rejected after testing proved that its weapons were not up to standards. Similarly, the Greek state did not support Pyrkal, which was producing the FN FAL rifle under license.

EBO was founded by the state in Aigio in 1976, after an agreement to initially produce under licence Heckler & Koch models adopted by the Greek Army, but with the intent to design arms of its own. During its foundation ceremony, a Greek pistol of the 1820s (used in the Greek Revolution) was placed on the foundation stone to represent the continuity of Greece's arms-making craft.

Since that time, the company has grown by acquisition. In 2004, it merged with Pyrkal, forming Hellenic Defence Systems, in an effort of the Greek state to better control and regulate this sector of the nation's defence industry. Its financial state has been shaky almost since its early steps.

== Products ==
EBO develops its own products (including by founder and designers Athan Calligeris, Ph.D., Anastasios Georgiou, such as the Artemis 30 Anti-Aircraft System and the Aris IV Anti-Tank Rocket), Fairfox 2000 rifle.

- Kefefs rifle
- E44-E 81 mm Mortar

== Additional references ==
- Jane's Infantry Weapons (e.g., 2001-2002 ed.)
- L.S. Skartsis, "Modern Greece's Machines: A Comprehensive Guide to Greek Vehicle & Machine Manufacturers (1700 to Present)" (2026) ISBN 978-618-00-6734-7 (eBook)
