= E56 120 mm Mortar =

- Type: Mortar
- Place of origin: Greece

Service history
- In service: 1981–present

Production history
- Designer: Hellenic Defence Systems
- Manufacturer: Hellenic Defence Systems

Specifications
- Mass: 266 kg in field 431kg in transport
- Crew: 5
- Caliber: 120 millimetres (4.7 in)
- Rate of fire: 18 rpm sustained 4 rpm
- Maximum firing range: 9000m
- Feed system: manual

The E56 120 mm Mortar, is a Heavy Infantry mortar (referred to as such by its 120 mm payload, produced by Hellenic Defence Systems for the Hellenic Army.

== See also ==
- Soltam K6
- Mortar 120mm M95 Long Range
- 120 KRH 92
- Light mortar 120mm M75
