= Special Suppressive Antiterrorist Unit (Greece) =

Counter-terrorist Unit

- Eidikí Katastaltikí Antitromokratikí Monáda; Ειδική Κατασταλτική Αντιτρομοκρατική Μονάδα
- Active: 1978–present
- Country: Greece
- Agency: Hellenic Police
- Type: Police tactical unit
- Role: Counter-terrorism; Law enforcement
- Abbreviation: EKAM

Structure
- Operators: 200

Website
- Official website (en)

The Special Suppressive Antiterrorist Unit (EKAM; Greek: Ειδική Κατασταλτική Αντιτρομοκρατική Μονάδα, romanized: Eidikí Katastaltikí Antitromokratikí Monáda) is the police tactical unit of the Hellenic Police. EKAM was formed in 1978 by the merger of two tactical units, one from each of the police organizations (the Hellenic Gendarmerie and the Cities Police) that existed at the time.

The first units operational in 1978 were the Special Missions Unit (MEA) of the City Police and the Special Missions Department (TEIDA) of the Hellenic Gendarmerie. EKAM originally had 150 operators; however, when Greece became the host country of the 2004 Summer Olympics, their number increased to 200 due to the magnitude of the event.

== Training ==
The EKAM force is based in Athens, but several detachments are spread throughout Greece's major cities. Each officer is a full-time member who must have at least five years on the force before being allowed to try out. Many receive training from the Greek Army's Ranger School before going on to the police counter-terrorism school.

EKAM holds a three-month training program every year. For its training modern, purpose-built facilities are being used. Training can also take place in other locations such as buildings in urban or rural areas (inhabited or not), the Athens International Airport, planes of Olympic Airways, the Piraeus port infrastructure, the Hellenic Railroad system, the Athens Metro. Other places that have been decided as suitable to cover its training needs can also be used. The Unit is in constant cooperation with other Special Units abroad such as the FBI, SAS and ERU via the ATLAS Network.

EKAM operators are trained as specialists:

- Special Assault Teams
- Sharp shooters
- Breachers - Forced entry against doors and walls.
- Paratroopers
- Water Assaulters - Frogmen
- Rappel Teams
- Ski Assaulters
- Tactical Medics
- Canine Handlers

== Competitions ==
EKAM participates annually in the Warrior competition organized at King Abdullah II Special Operations Training Centre (KASOTC) in Jordan.

- May 2018: 5th place overall, the highest score of any European group.
- May 2017: 3rd place in two of the events and 5th place overall
- May 2016: 8th place overall

== Operations and critics ==
EKAM operates all around Greece and abroad whenever is deemed necessary. It has confronted challenges such as hostage situations and it has contributed in the arrests of many dangerous criminals, playing a key role in the dismantling of the November 17 and Revolutionary People's Struggle terrorist organizations.

In March 2003, it successfully resolved an incident on a Turkish Airlines flight, which was hijacked during a domestic flight in Turkey, from Istanbul to Ankara, and was forced to land at the Athens International Airport by the hijacker. The Unit stormed the plane and arrested the hijacker by incapacitating him with a taser. All the hostages were safely released.

In 2022, EKAM was called to a hostage situation in the Pallini suburb of Attica after a man held 4 people hostage. The man was apprehended and nobody was killed in the incident.

In the same year, they were called in a hostage and domestic violence situation that lasted several hours. The perpetrator and former partner of the victim forced his ex-wife at knifepoint to follow him from her house in Galatsi to his own in Agios Panteleimonas. At home, he threatened the police units by holding a gas cylinder and a lighter, threatening to cause an explosion. According to an interview with a police officer, the suspect stated: "I will blow up the whole building, whatever is destined to happen will happen, I don't care about my life, I will go to Allah". Although the suspect and the police had established negotiations beforehand, it was established that the suspect was not going to surrender. After the building was evacuated by police, EKAM operators and other police units breached the door and arrested the man. They were later commended by then–Minister of Citizen Protection Takis Theodorikakos.

In October 2023, after the beginning of the Gaza war, EKAM was deployed to various locations, including a Panathinaikos vs Maccabi Tel Aviv basketball match, due to the heightened security risk.

In February 2024, EKAM was called to Glyfada, after a shooting involving a 76-year-old man. The suspect was a former employee of a shipping company of the Karnessis family, who had been fired after working for the company for 36 years. The perpetrator, knowing the building well, gained access from the basement and headed initially to the mezzanine floor, where he opened fire indiscriminately. Three people were killed, including the owner Maria Karnessis, the shipping company's managing director Antonis Vlassakis, and the former captain and company accountant Elias Koukoularis. A short time after, an EKAM team entered the premises of the shipping company in order to arrest the perpetrator. He was found dead in the basement with the shotgun next to him. During the operation, EKAM located and evacuated two other employees of the shipping company.

On Sunday December 8, 2024, supporters of the HTS group who overthrew President Bashar al-Assad entered the Syrian embassy in Greece and raised the flag of rebel organisations. EKAM was sent in to subdue the subjects.

=== Failures ===
However, the history of operations of the EL.AS. in which EKAM forces participated includes two failures that caused intense public concern about the level of training and the degree of competence of these units.

==== Niobe Street Fiasco ====
The first incident occurred on September 23, 1998, and is also known as the "Sorin Matei Case". The Greek-Romanian thug Sorin Matei broke into the apartment of the Ginakis family at number 4 Niovi Street. He took the three members of the family as hostage with the threat of setting off a hand grenade. The police believed that the grenade was fake and attempted an invasion. Matei was arrested but armed the grenade, the explosion of which seriously injured one of the hostages, Amalia Ginaki. Ginaki died a few days later at the Red Cross Hospital, where she was being treated. The incident compelled the chief of police Athanassios Vassilopoulos to resign.

==== Failure to arrest Kostas Passaris ====
The second incident occurred on July 31, 2001, when the notorious Greek thug Kostas Passaris escaped from an ambush by the Greek Police. Two police observers were set up near the apartment building at 52-54 Hipparchou Street, in Neos Kosmos, where Passaris' apartment had been located, and were waiting for him to appear. The remaining forces were located within a 500-meter radius so as not to make their presence noticeable. As soon as the observers noticed Passaris, they notified the EKAM's men who had set up an ambush inside the thug's apartment and were waiting to arrest him. Passaris went up to his apartment, is surprised by the EKAM forces and tried to escape. The EKAM men shot him four times, hitting him once in the leg and once in the shoulder. Confusion was caused and they did not notify the police outside that the perpetrator was trying to escape. The EKAM men were slow to pursue the criminal and he escaped through the exit of the apartment building, limping with an injured leg.

==== The "Junta-Fest" ====
Finally, several men and officers of the EKAM participated in 1993, a few days after the 26th anniversary of the April 21 Coup, in an open-air celebration in Thessaloniki where, among other things, they had fun to the sounds of songs praising the Colonels' Junta and "baptized" an Albanian immigrant in a nearby river, humiliating him. These events, which took place in the presence of the then commander of the EKAM Thessaloniki, were revealed in 1997 by the newspaper "Eleftherotypia" and became known as the "junto fest". The First-instance Three-Member Court of Appeal of Thessaloniki declared the eight police officers, including two former police directors, who participated there, not guilty.

== Duties ==
- Hostage rescue
- High risk arrests
- High risk VIP's escort
- Prisoner Transport
- W.M.D (Weapons of mass destruction) (C.B.R.N)
- Special counterterrorism operations and operations against organized crime in collaboration with the Hellenic Security Forces
- Rescue operations including physical disasters in cooperation with the Fire Brigade, but more specifically trained and equipped to intervene to chemical and biological attacks.

== Equipment ==
Model	Type	Origin	Notes	References
Ruger GP100	Revolver	United States		
Glock 21	Semi-automatic pistol	Austria		
SIG Sauer P229	Semi-automatic pistol	Germany		
FN Five-seven	Semi-automatic pistol	Belgium		
CZ 75	Semi-automatic pistol	Czech Republic		
Heckler & Koch MP5	Submachine gun	Germany	A3, A4, A5, SD, K and K2 variants used	
Heckler & Koch UMP	Submachine gun	Germany		
Uzi	Submachine gun	Belgium	FN Herstal variants used	
FN P90	Submachine gun	Belgium		
M16	Assault rifle	United States	A2 & A4 variants used	
M4A1	Assault rifle	United States		
Heckler & Koch G3A3	Assault rifle	West Germany		
AK-47	Assault rifle	Soviet Union		
Remington 870	Shotgun	United States		
Benelli M4 Super 90	Shotgun	Italy		
Vepr-12	Shotgun	Russia	Fitted with foldable stocks, EOTECH sights and tactical scopes.	
FN MAG	Machine gun	Belgium		
Heckler & Koch G3SG/1	Sniper rifle	Germany	Fitted with a Carl Zeiss 10x42 scope; may also be equipped with a special night vision device	
Accuracy International Arctic Warfare	Sniper rifle	United Kingdom	Mounted with Schmidt and Bender 3-12x50 scopes;may also be equipped with a special night vision device	
SR-25	Sniper rifle	United States	Mounted with Leupold 3-12x50 scopes	
Kefefs	Sniper rifle	Greece	Version P; may also be equipped with a special night vision device	
