= LRSVM Tamnava =

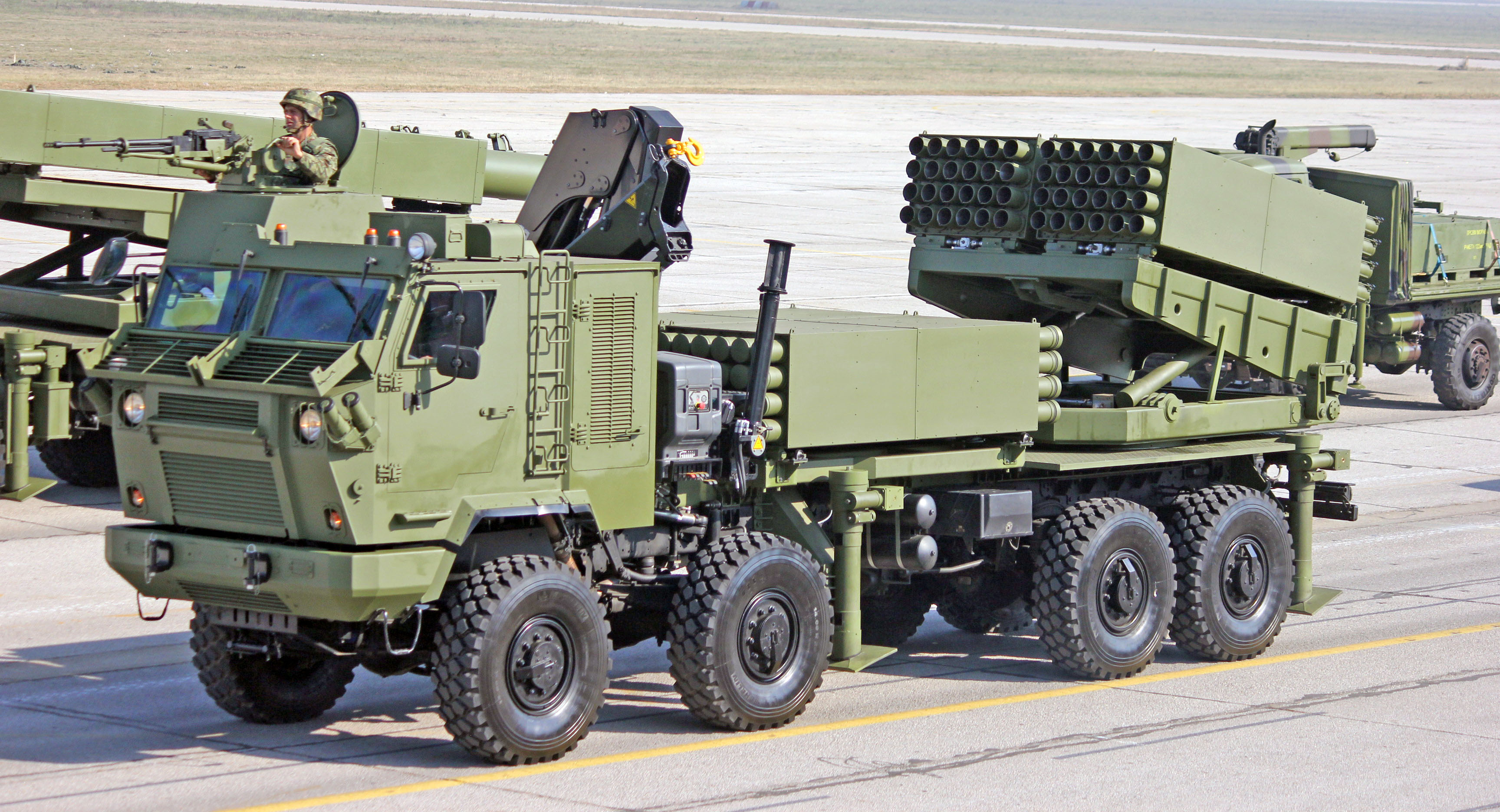
- LRSVM Tamnava at Batajnica Air Base
- Type: Self-propelled, modular multiple rocket launcher
- Place of origin: Serbia

Production history
- Designer: Military Technical Institute
- Designed: 2019

Specifications
- Mass: 38 tonnes
- Length: 10.3 m (33 ft 10 in)
- Width: 2.8 m (9 ft 2 in)
- Height: 3.5 m (11 ft 6 in)
- Crew: 3
- Caliber: 262 mm (10.3 in) or 122 mm (4.8 in)
- Maximum firing range: 70 km (43 mi) for 262mm 40 km (25 mi) for 122mm
- Engine: diesel

LRSVM Tamnava (Serbian Cyrillic: Лансер Ракета Самоходни Вишецевни Модуларни Тамнава, romanized: Lanser Raketa Samohodni Višecevni Modularni Tamnava) is a Serbian modular multiple rocket launcher developed by Yugoimport SDPR. It is based on a Kamaz 6560 8x8 truck chassis, but a chassis from other manufacturers can also be used. It is named after the Tamnava river in Serbia.

== Development ==
The system was revealed by Yugoimport SDPR in 2020 with the intended purpose of strengthening the artillery capabilities of the Serbian Armed Forces.

LRSVM 262/122 mm was designed as a modular system. It can use launch containers with 262 mm caliber missiles as well as 122 mm Grad missiles. The system is fully automated, equipped with GPS and INS systems, and can operate completely autonomously with the possible execution of programmed combat mission. The circular error probable (CEP) is less than 15 meters. The system has the ability to accept two spare 122 mm launch containers. Charging and discharging of the containers is done using a crane that is mounted on a platform. There is also the option of installing reusable launch tubes.

Tamnava's modular containers when combined use 122 and 262mm missiles consisting of two launched modules 122mm (24 missiles) and two 262mm modules (six missiles). When it only uses 122mm missiles, the system has 48 missiles at its disposal.

== Operators ==
=== Current operators ===
- Cyprus – Cypriot National Guard bought one battery of six launchers. First displayed to the public in October 2025.

=== Future operators ===
- Serbia– On order for the Serbian Army.

=== Potential operators ===
- Greece – In 2022, the Hellenic Army was presented the MLRS Tamnava as it seeks to replace its RM-70s.

== See also ==
- M-77 Oganj – (Yugoslavia)
- T-122 Sakarya – (Turkey)
- RM-70 – (Czechoslovakia)
- LRSVM Morava – (Serbia)
