= Artemis 30 =

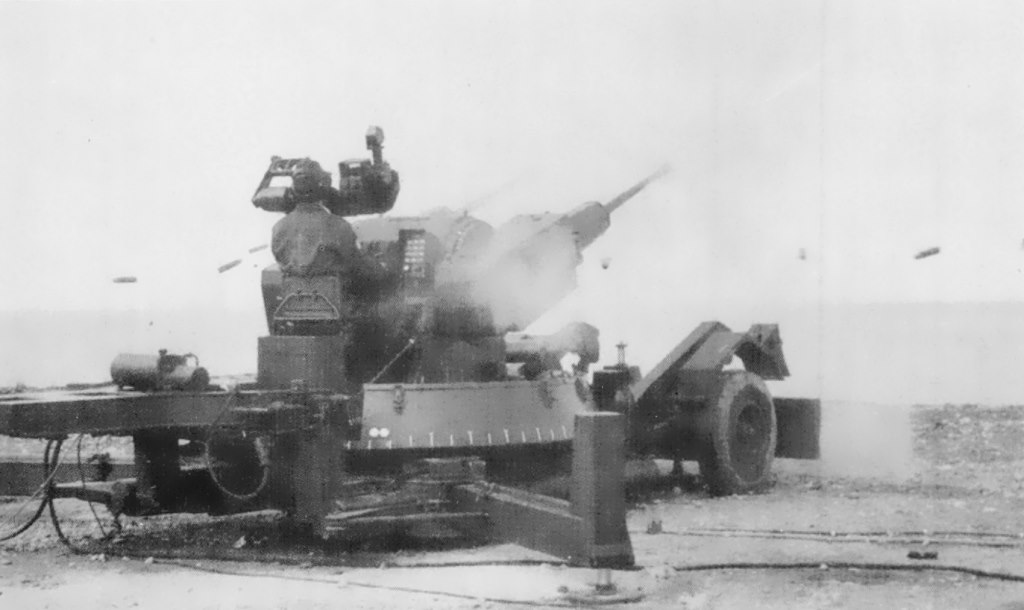
- Type: Anti-aircraft system
- Place of origin: Greece

Service history
- Used by: Greece

Production history
- Designer: Anastasios Georgiou & Athanassios Calligeris, Ph.D.
- Designed: 1982
- Manufacturer: Hellenic Arms Industry

Specifications
- Mass: 7,400 kg (16,300 lb) (travelling with ammunition)
- Length: 7.95 m (26 ft 1 in) (travelling)
- Width: 2.375 m (8 ft) (travelling)
- Height: 2.25 m (7 ft 5 in) (travelling)
- Shell: Aluminium cased 30 mm x 173 mm
- Caliber: 30 mm (1.2 in)
- Action: Gas operated
- Carriage: Four wheel twin axle split type with onboard generator
- Elevation: -5° to +85°
- Traverse: 360°
- Rate of fire: 800 rpm per barrel
- Muzzle velocity: 1,035 m/s (3,400 ft/s) (HEI ammunition)
- Maximum firing range: 8,400 m (27,600 ft)
- Sights: On board gyroscopic 2D tracking sight

The Artemis 30 is an anti-aircraft gun system originally developed in 1982 and produced by the Hellenic Arms designed by Anastasios Georgiou (EBO) and Athanassios Calligeris, Ph.D. Designer lots parts of twin barrels for use by the Greek armed forces (Hellenic Army) in the Aegean Sea. The system is named after the ancient Greek goddess of the hunt, Artemis.

The Artemis 30 consists of twin 30 mm Mauser MK30 Model F autocannons connected to a large central drum mounted on a four-wheeled towed carriage. A total of 500 rounds are carried ready to use in the mount. normally deployed in 6 twin mounts per battery, and has a maximum range of 8,400 metres and a firing rate of 800 rounds per minute per barrel.

The Mauser Model F gun was manufactured by EKO, has a 30 mm caliber and a torque of 800 to 920 watts. with 0.5 mRad dispersion. The gun consists of about 72 parts, of which 12 are moving. The ammunition was manufactured by EBO. The system has the ability to target targets with ammunition such as 30 mm GAU-8 / A (HEI, APHEI, ARDS TP with or without tracers). The fire control system comes from Philips and consists of a sensor assembly in a separate trailer (trailer wheeled vehicle) featuring: a video camera for automatic target tracking / tracking and a laser distance meter or TV camera equipped with infrared imaging to set target day and night in good weather conditions. Additionally, it is possible to add target tracking capture radar by giving the station worthy title of all weather. ARTEMIS-30 can be easily operated from a distance, from a special cage, e.g. a wheeled vehicle capable of being remote controlled, and the system also has a seat on the system with the necessary controls. The system is intended to be equipped with additional search radar (rotatable), capable of simultaneously providing target information to multiple ARTEMIS-30 A / A arrays at a distance of 40 km.

== Users ==
- Greece: In limited service.

== Bibliography ==
- Jane's Land Based Air Defence 2005-2006.
- Jane's Infantry Weapons 2005-2006.
