= Kefefs =

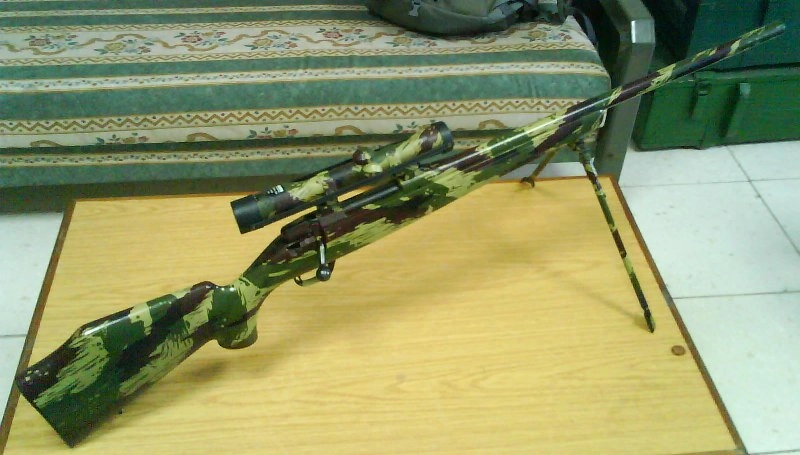
- Type: Sniper rifle
- Place of origin: Greece

Service history
- Used by: Greece

Production history
- Designed: 1986
- Manufacturer: Elliniki Viomichania Oplon
- Produced: 1995
- Variants: See Variants

Specifications
- Mass: 4.4 kg (No scope/bipod); 4.72 kg (With bipod)
- Length: 1200 mm (Entire weapon)
- Barrel length: 675 mm (Barrel)
- Crew: 1
- Cartridge: 7.62×51mm NATO
- Action: Bolt action
- Muzzle velocity: 840 m/s
- Effective firing range: 800 m
- Maximum firing range: 3500 m
- Feed system: 5-round internal magazine
- Sights: Telescopic sight. Night vision scopes also accepted

The Kefefs (Greek: Κηφεύς) or Kifefs, Kefeus is a Greek-made bolt-action sniper rifle designed by Hellenic Arms Industry in 1986 and named after X the king of the Arcadian settlement of Tegea. The Kefefs fires rounds chambered in 7.62×51mm NATO.

== Design details ==
The Kefefs rifle contains the following features:

- It has a cold-hammered, high-precision, free-floating, exposed barrel made of special high-grade steel while its receiver, bolt and all metal components are also made of special steel.
- It uses a simple and robust bolt-action mechanism with a 50° opening angle, enables the bolt to be flexible and easy to open. The third lug of the three locking lugs located at the front of the bolt acts as a rail which gives the bolt a friction-free and smooth movement.
- The firing mechanism incorporates an extremely quiet, thumb-operated safety the stiffness of which is adjustable.
- Designed by Athan Calligeris Ph.D. with an ergonomically and elegantly designed stock, which is made of high-quality walnut with cross-knurling, is of the Monte Carlo model.
- The trigger pull and travel can also be adjusted. A wide range of telescopic sights and sight mounts is available to suit the user's requirements, since it is the sighting system which plays an important role in sniping.
- Such scopes are adjustable for windage and elevation. Night vision devices are also available.

The weapon is supplied with a bipod (having a quick release mechanism), a carrying sling and a complete field-service kit.

== Variants ==
There are two variants of the Kefefs:

- Kefefs-M: A variant of the Kefefs made for military personnel coated with high-strength, heat-resistant camouflage paints with either forest or desert camouflage.
- Kefefs-P: A variant of the Kefefs made for police personnel with a slightly longer, heavier, externally fluted barrel and an oil-polished stock.

== Users ==
- Greece: Used by special forces and the Ειδική Κατασταλτική Αντιτρομοκρατική Μονάδα (EKAM) unit of the Hellenic Police, and unit of the Hellenic Army
