= E44-E 81 mm Mortar =

Greek infantry mortar

The E44-E is an 81 mm infantry mortar produced by EBO, and now EAS (Hellenic Arms Industry) for the Hellenic Army, to provide efficient and accurate indirect firepower at the company and battalion level.

== See also ==
- Hellenic Army
- Hellenic Arms Industry
- List of equipment of the Hellenic Army
