= Steyr 90 series =

The Steyr 90 series is a cab over truck originally introduced in 1968, built by Steyr-Daimler-Puch AG in Steyr, Austria. It has a tilting cab and is of a distinct shape, which survived into the twenty-first century with China's Sinotruk. In 1978 the facelifted Steyr 91 replaced the 90, and it was in turn replaced by the redesigned Steyr 92 in 1986. Considering its comparatively low production numbers an unusually wide range of models and configurations were available, necessitated by Steyr's dominance of the Austrian truck market in the period - in 1980 about 35% of trucks on the roads there were made by Steyr.

== Steyr 90 ==
Steyr 90
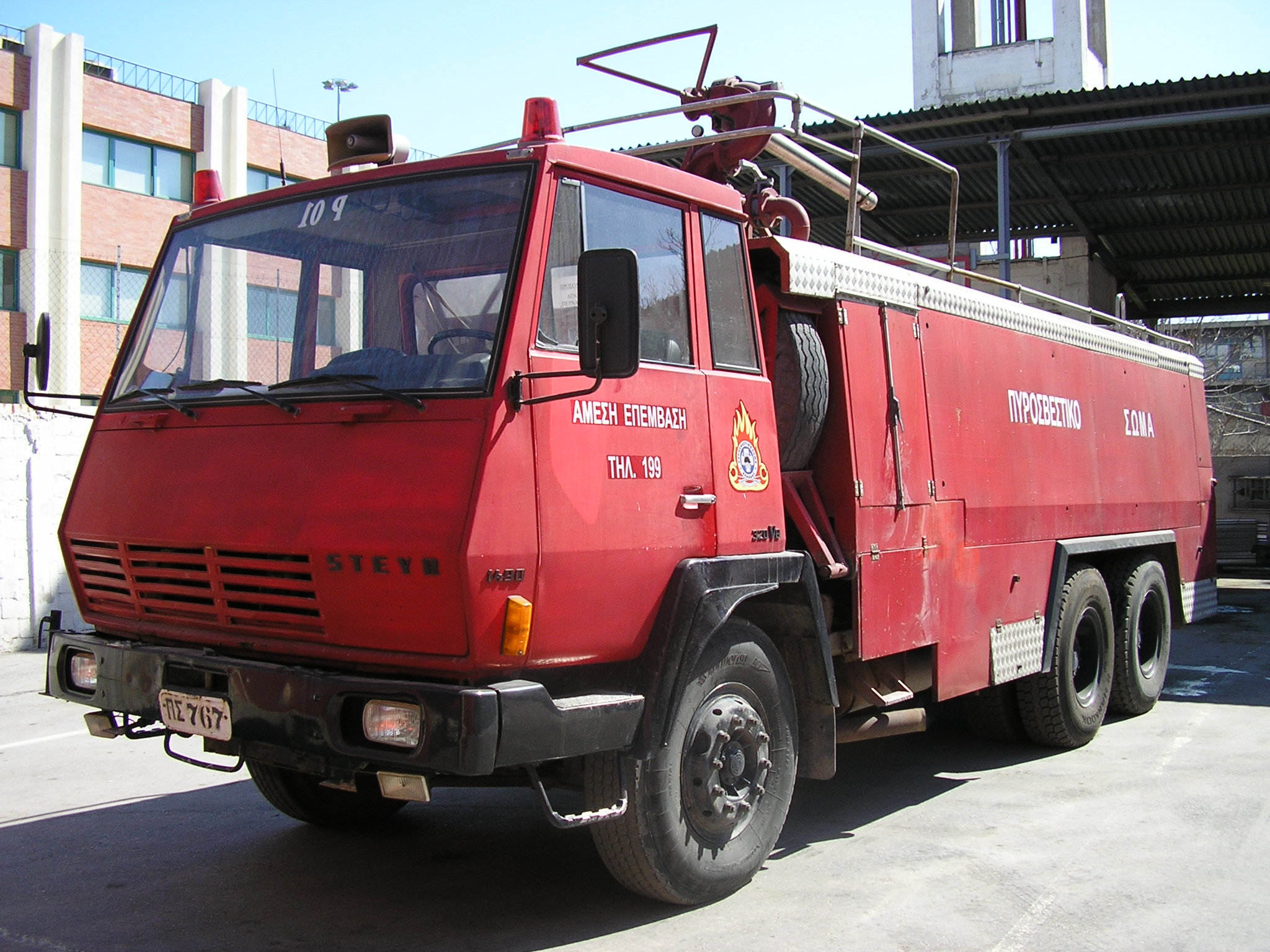
- Steyr 1490.320 6x4

Overview
- Manufacturer: Steyr-Daimler-Puch
- Also called: Steyr Plus
- Production: 1968–1979; Steyr, Austria

Body and chassis
- Body style: Cabover truck

Dimensions
- Curb weight: 8.5–28 t (19,000–62,000 lb)

The 90 series was a result of Steyr's failure to link up with another European truck manufacturer. Instead they chose to go it alone, and developed the new Typ 160 cabin design to replace the outmoded, bonneted 680-880 series. The cabin is very distinct, being of an angular design with very large glass surfaces. Good visibility helped promote sales for use in construction and distribution. Other distinctions were the asymmetric radiator opening (a feature which was to last until the end of Steyr truck production) and a standard roof hatch. The cab was not of a tilting design, rather it had a large front opening through which maintenance could be carried out.

A large range of engines and layouts were available, including all-wheel drive models (from 1969). Later, a sleeper cab was also added. The engines used are of Steyr's own manufacture, and are all diesels. These were 6.0 or 8.1 litre sixes, as well as a 12-litre V8, and were also available turbocharged. The V8, which was first shown in 1971, was the only one of the 90 range to be equipped with a tilting cabin. The 6.6 litre WD 612 engine was added in 1976. In 1969 the smaller 590/690 range was added, using a modified Hanomag-Henschel cab. This range lasted until 1982, when a smaller-engined version of the 91 series replaced it.

The 90 series names were of either three or four digits, with the first one or two denoting the payload in tons and the last two being "90". The range was from 790 to the four-axle 1890. Only about 50 of the 1890 were built, specifically for the Swiss market which had special requirements for maximum weight per axle.

== Steyr 91 ==
Steyr 91
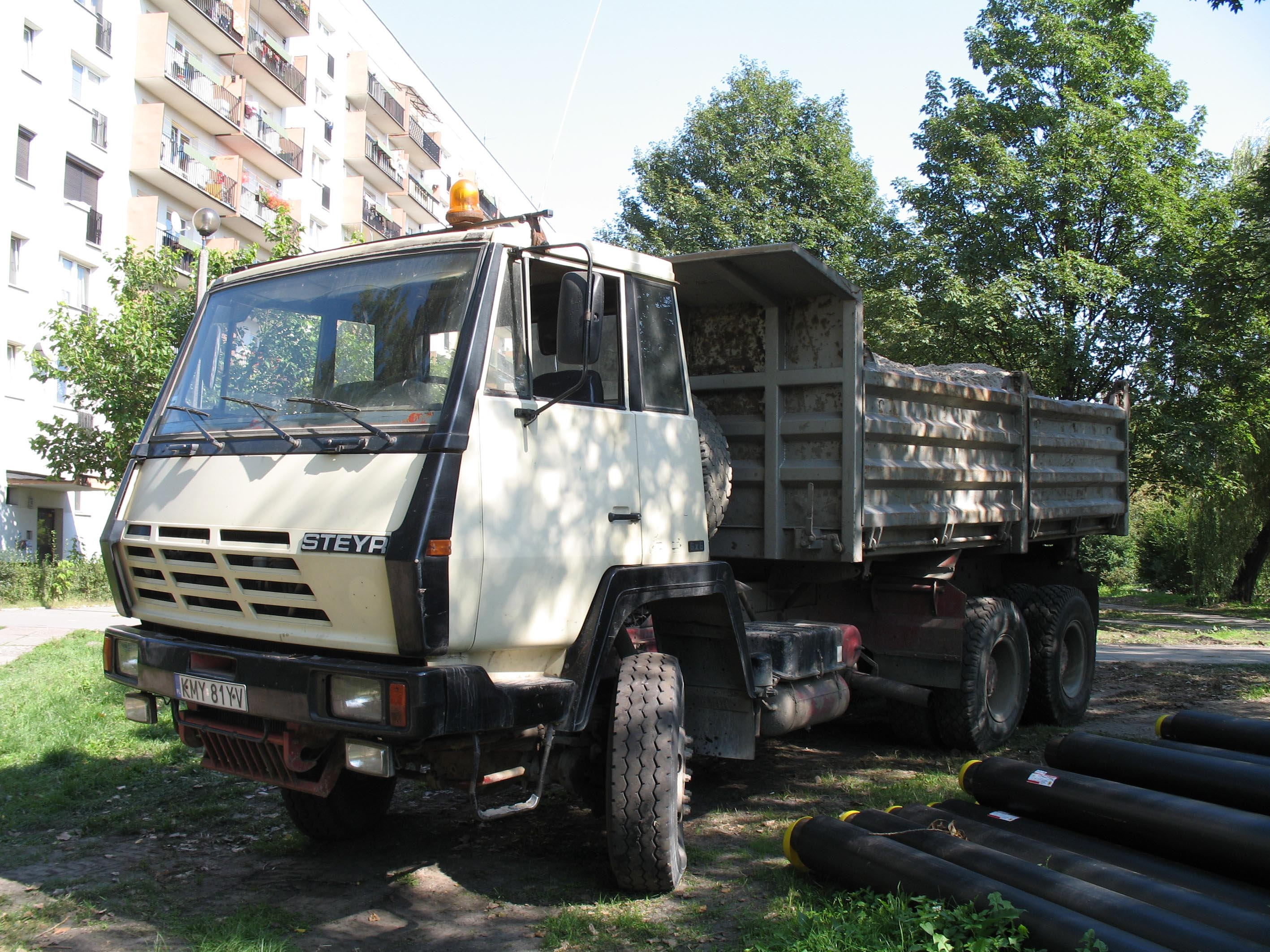
- Facelifted Steyr 91

Overview
- Manufacturer: Steyr-Daimler-Puch
- Production: 1978–200?; Steyr, Austria

Body and chassis
- Body style: Cabover truck
- Layout: 4x2, 4x4, 6x2, 6x4, 6x6, 8x2/4
- Related: UTDC Percheron

Dimensions
- Curb weight: 8.5–28 t (19,000–62,000 lb)

The modernized Steyr 91 series replaced the "90" beginning in 1978. It was now of a tilt-cab design (not for the lighter models) and received a plastic grille and front bumper. The cabin was better insulated, and thus quieter and warmer than earlier models. The four-axle models sold better than those in the 90 series, as they were now offered in several markets aside from Switzerland and also for heavy construction work.

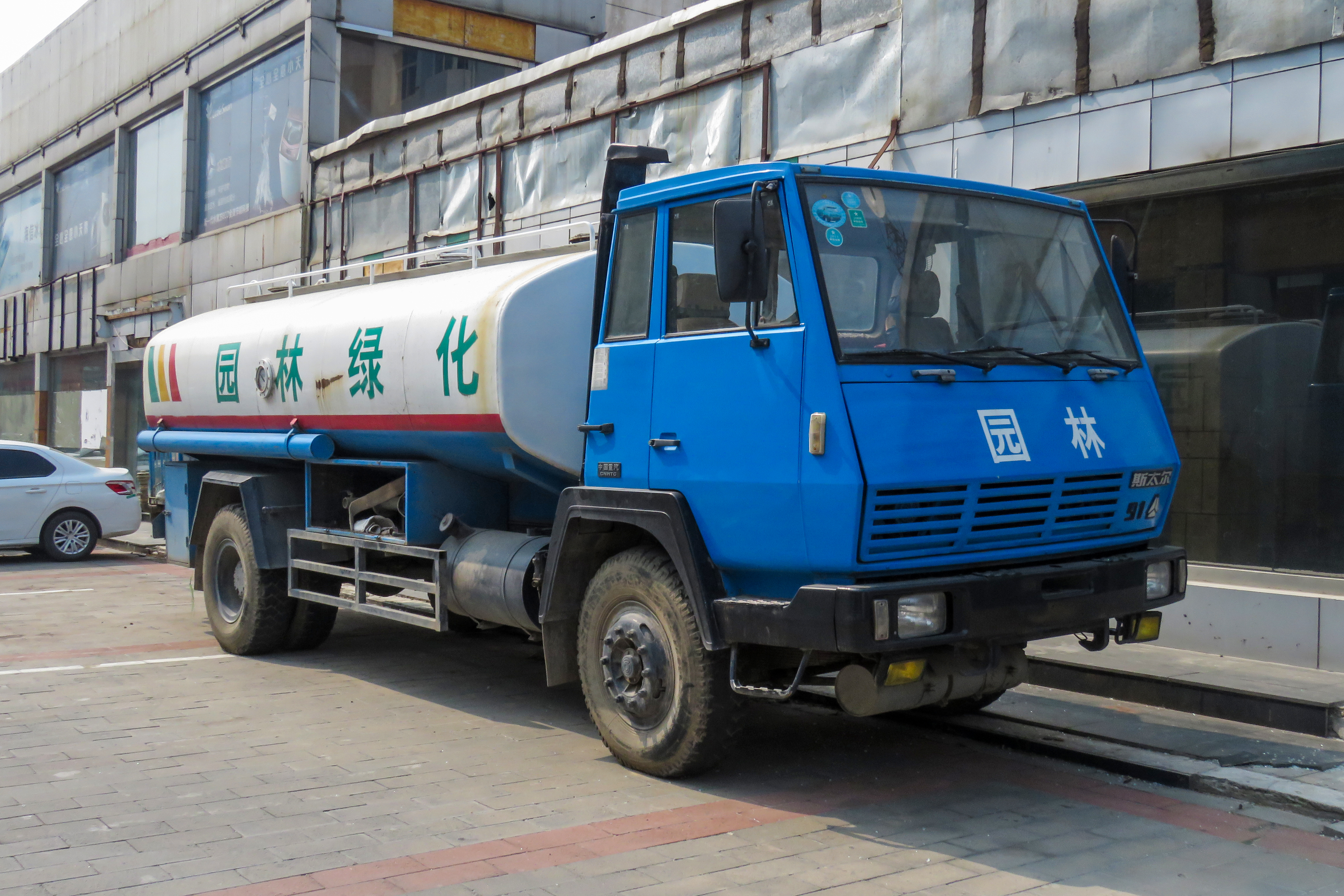
A Steyr 91 built by China National Heavy Duty Truck Group

As with its predecessor, the mid-range models were introduced first with heavy and light models added gradually thereafter. Originally it was available with 6.6 or 9.7 litre diesel sixes (WD 612, WD 615) or the 12 litre eight. The lighter duty 591 and 691 models, introduced in 1982, received a detuned version of the 6.6 litre "six". They had an updated version of the old Hanomag body. A twelve-litre six-cylinder was also developed, but never entered production due to high tooling costs. Later models received another facelift with more plastic cladding and a new grille. The light and medium-duty versions were replaced by the new 92 series cabin beginning in 1986, but heavier duty versions continued to use the Plus series cabin until gradually replaced by MAN's F2000 design beginning in 1994.

Steyr's naming practice changed in the 1980s, with the two leading digits denoting the approximate gross weight in tonnes, followed by an "S" (for civilian), followed by two digits for tens of horsepowers. Thus, the 1291.31 became the 19S31.

=== Military career ===
From the all-wheel drive 91, the militarized 91M was also developed. Appearing in 1983, this met with considerable sales success. Aside from Austria (which used e.g. the 1491 as a Heavy Logistics Vehicle or Counter-NBC-Vehicle), Canada, Saudi Arabia, and Greece also used these. The 1200 vehicles sold to Canada, designated "Heavy Logistics Vehicle, Wheeled" or HLVW by the Canadian military, were called "Percheron" (or UTDC 24M32) and were assembled by local partner UTDC (Can-Car). They entered service there in 1990 after a protracted selection process. It was also manufactured in Greece, where the earlier 680 series was manufactured until the end of 1984. Steyr also entered the US Army's competition for a new Family of Medium Tactical Vehicles (FMTV), a contract they won. The trucks in question have been manufactured in Texas, using Steyr components, including engines and some body panels (actually those from the 92 series). The FMTV has seen service across the globe, with a number of countries' armed forces.

== Steyr 92 ==
Steyr 92

Overview
- Manufacturer: Steyr-Daimler-Puch
- Also called: Steyr 12M18/12S18
- Production: 1986–2003; Steyr, Austria

Body and chassis
- Body style: Cabover truck
- Layout: 4x2, 4x4, 6x4, 6x6
- Related: FMTV; ERF ES-series

Powertrain
- Engine: 6.6 L WD 612 diesel I6

Dimensions
- Curb weight: 9.5–16 t (21,000–35,000 lb)

The mid-range Steyr 92 received a fully redesigned robot-built cabin, much more aerodynamic with rounded corners. It still retained some Steyr characteristics such as the offset grille opening and large glazing, although by now these features were more common. It was introduced in the spring of 1986 but only replaced the lighter and medium parts of the range. Heavier and articulated trucks retained the 91 series cab. The military 12M18 truck also uses the 92's cabin, as does the FMTV of the US Army. A civilian version of the 12M18 is also made, called the 12S18. Steyr's biggest markets at this time, aside from Austria, were Greece and Switzerland. At the time of introduction, only an updated version of the smaller WD 612, a 6,595 cc (402 cu in) diesel inline-six, were available. Turbocharged and intercooled versions were also available, meaning that outputs of 136, 177, or 210 PS were available.

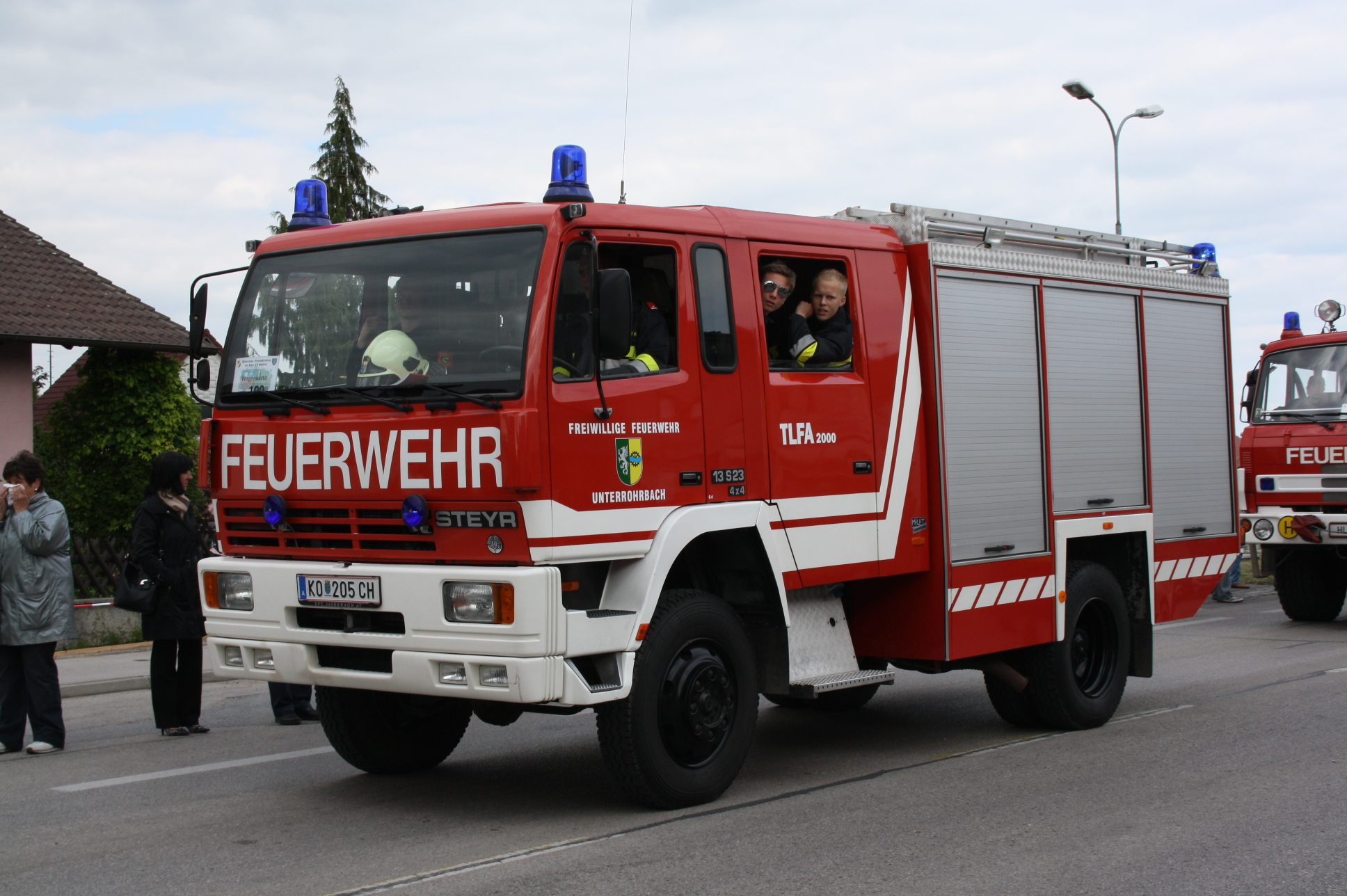
Steyr 13S23 fire engine (Austria)

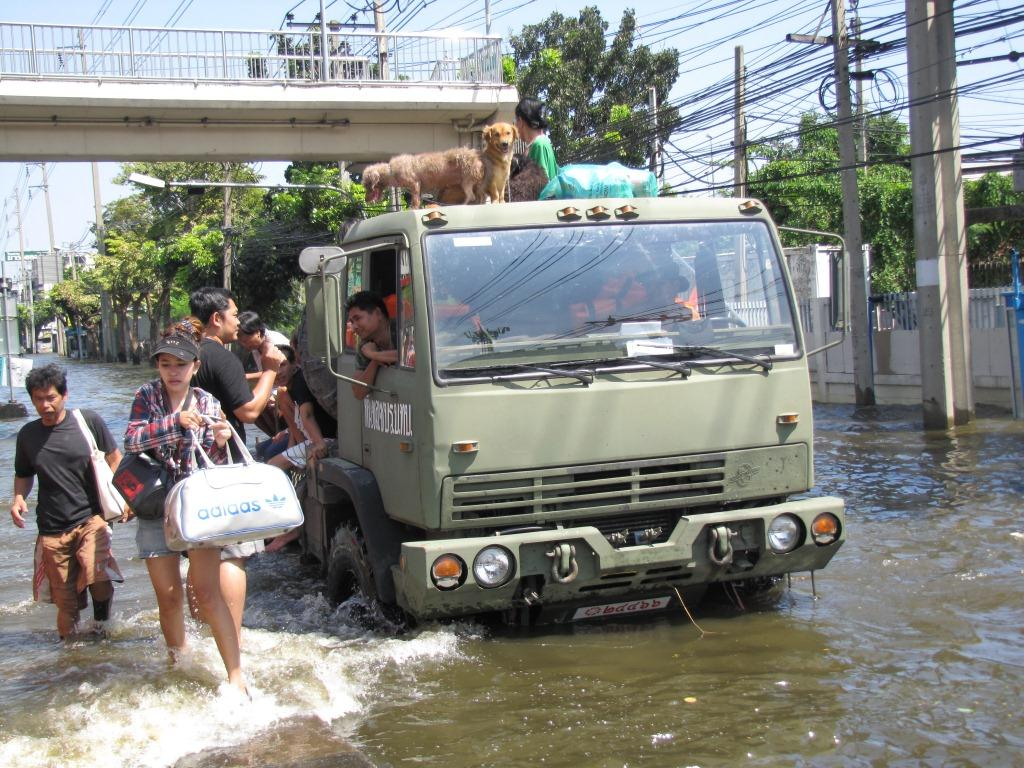
FMTV in use with the Thai armed forces during the floods of 2011

The naming of the 92 series (also adapted for later models of the 91) refers to the vehicle's gross weight, followed by an "S" or "M" for civilian or military versions, followed by a number denoting tens of horsepower. Thus, a 210 PS 16-ton model would be called 16S21. Lighter models used Steyr's own transmissions, while heavier versions received ZF units. The axles were all Steyr's own, axles being a mainstay of Steyr's production. The 92 series cab was also used by Britain's ERF beginning in the late 1980s, for their medium-weight ES series. Coincidentally, ERF became part of MAN in 2000.
