= Hellenic Defence Systems =

Greek defence company

- Native name: Greek: Ελληνικά Αμυντικά Συστήματα
- Romanized name: Ellinika Amyntika Systimata
- Type: State-owned enterprise
- Industry: Defence
- Predecessor: EBO; Pyrkal
- Founded: 2004; 22 years ago
- Headquarters: Hymettus, Athens, Attica, Greece
- Area served: worldwide
- Key people: Athanasios Tsiolkas (Chairman); Νikolaos Κostopoulos (CEO)
- Products: Munitions, Small arms, Artillery, Explosive
- Revenue: 15.250.162€ (2022)
- Operating income: 4.434.613€ (2022)
- Net income: -25.628.739€ (2022)
- Total assets: 268.355.778€ (2022)
- Owner: Hellenic Republic
- Number of employees: 331 (2023)
- Website: www.eas.gr

Hellenic Defense Systems (Greek: Ελληνικά Αμυντικά Συστήματα, Ellinika Amyntika Systimata, abbreviated EAS) is the company formed by the merger in 2004 of the Greek defence companies Hellenic Arms Industry and Pyrkal. Upon its creation, it was a major manufacturer with thousands of employees, with a product range that included most land weapons in use today, as well as an established exporter to many countries in the world.

As of 2018, EAS reported a loss, despite the Greek government paying €19.5 million (equivalent to €23.2 million in 2023) towards the company's bills and debts, attributed to the ongoing economic crisis that affected Greece from 2008 to 2018. The company reported further net losses of €29.8 million in 2023.

== Products ==
- E56 120 mm Mortar
- FN Minimi
- HK G3
- HK USP
- HK MP5
- HK 11A1
- MG 3 machine gun
