= ASCOD =

Austro-Spanish armoured fighting vehicle

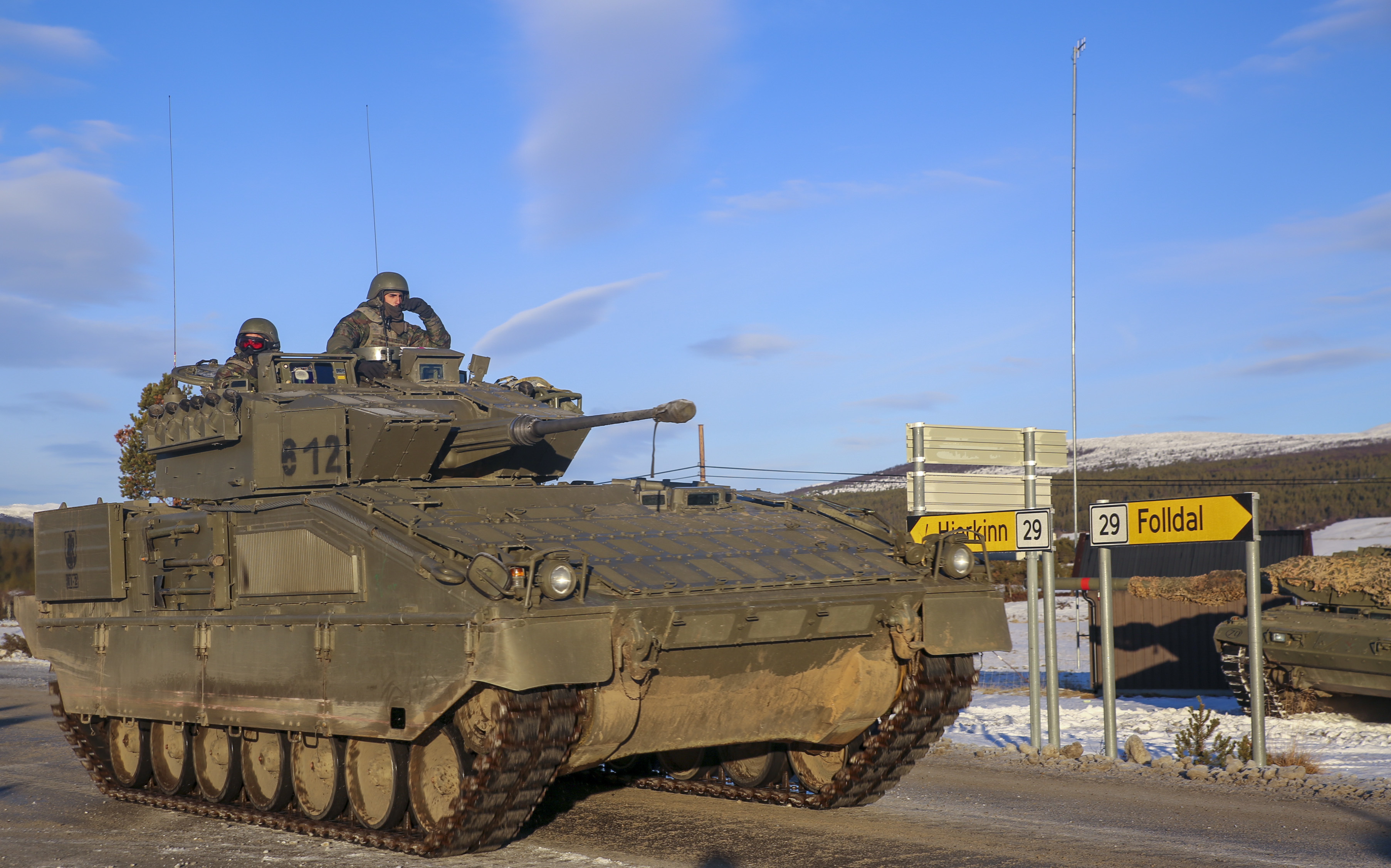
- The Spanish Armed Forces Pizarro variant of the ASCOD
- Type: Armoured fighting vehicle (ASCOD Ulan/Pizarro)
- Place of origin: Austria and Spain

Service history
- In service: 2002–present
- Used by: See Operators

Production history
- Developed into: ASCOD 2 (ASCOD SV); Sabrah light tank; GD Ajax; GD Griffin; M10 Booker; Vehículo de Apoyo de Cadenas

Specifications
- Mass: 26.3 tonnes (26,300 kg) (ASCOD Pizarro); 28 tonnes (31 short tons) (ASCOD Ulan)
- Length: 6.83 m (22 ft) (Pizarro/Ulan), 9.5 m (31.16 ft) (ASCOD)
- Width: 3.64 m (12 ft)
- Height: 2.43 m (8 ft)
- Crew: 3 + 8 passengers
- Armor: rolled steel armor options for explosive reactive armor and composite armor
- Main armament: 30 mm Mauser MK 30/2 (ASCOD Ulan/Pizarro)
- Secondary armament: MG3 7.62×51mm NATO (Pizarro); FN MAG 7.62×51mm NATO (Ulan/ASCOD 2)
- Engine: Diesel; 600 hp (Pizarro fase 1); 720 hp (Pizarro fase 2); 720 hp (Ulan)
- Suspension: torsion bar and Piedrafita rotary dampers models AR01 and AR02.
- Maximum speed: Road: 72 km/h

The ASCOD (Austrian Spanish Cooperation Development) armoured fighting vehicle family is the product of a cooperation agreement between Austrian Steyr-Daimler-Puch AG and Spanish General Dynamics Santa Bárbara Sistemas. Both companies are now divisions of a unit of General Dynamics. The ASCOD family includes the LT 105 light tank equipped with a 105 mm gun, a surface-to-air missile launcher, an anti-tank guided missile launcher, mortar carrier, R&R vehicle, command-and-control vehicle, ambulance, artillery observer, and the AIFV model.

In Spanish service, the vehicle is called "Pizarro". The Austrian version is called "Ulan".

== History ==
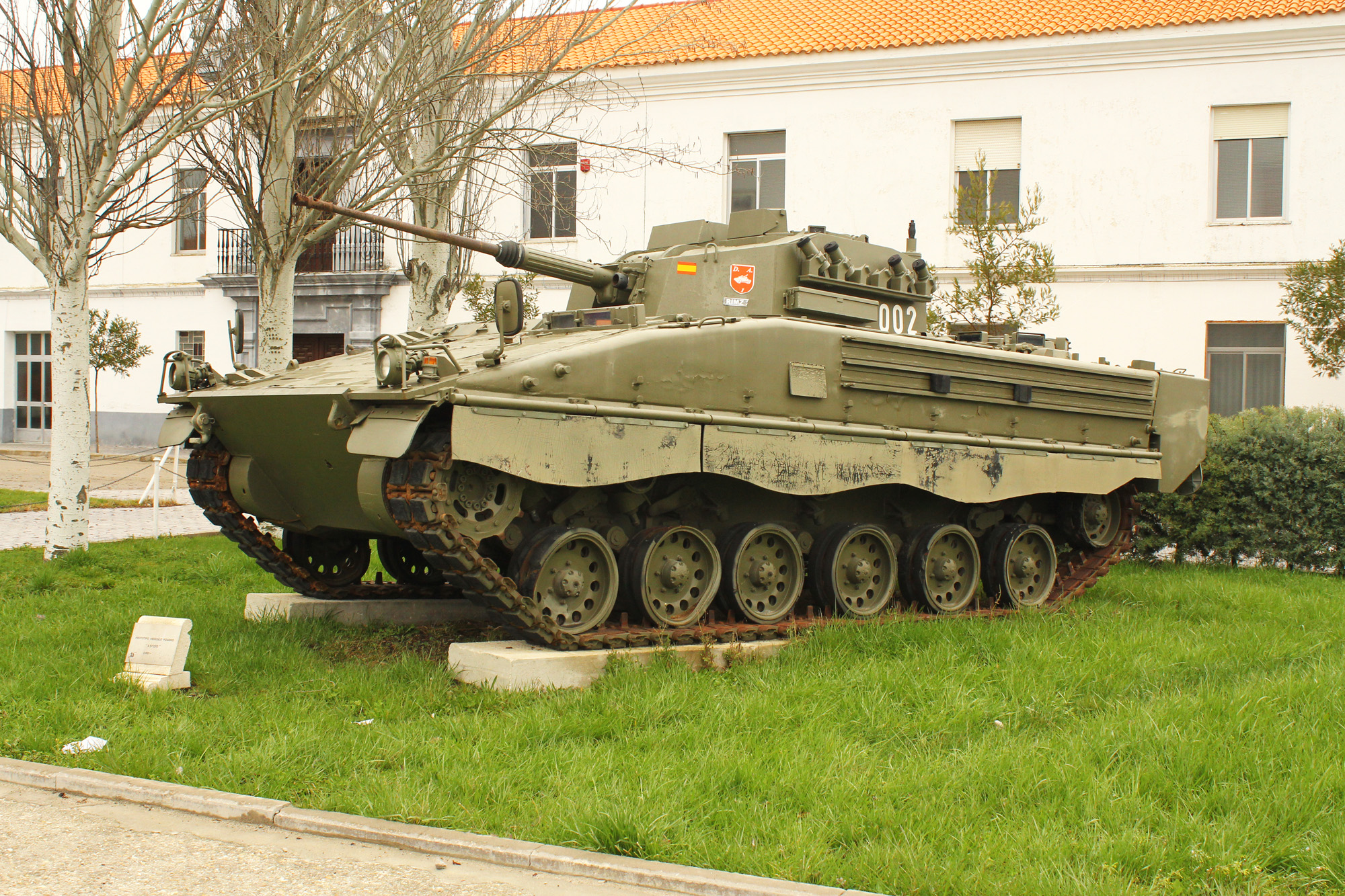
An ASCOD prototype in Spain

The ASCOD was designed to replace the older light armoured fighting vehicles of the Austrian and Spanish armies, such as the M113 armored personnel carrier and the Saurer APC. The Ulan, the Austrian version of the Pizarro, would provide a flexible complement to their heavy Leopard 2A4. The Ulan would allow the Austrian army to deploy rapidly and effectively over longer distances, especially for foreseeable future operations—such as trouble-spots for UN operations.

In 1982, Steyr-Daimler-Puch Spezialfahrzeug initiated the conception phase for the development of a new infantry fighting vehicle. This was followed by initial talks with the militaries of Greece, Norway and Switzerland to find the desired requirements for a new IFV. In 1985, the decision to develop a new IFV was made following the Bundesheer announcement of the military requirement for the Kampfschützenpanzer 90 (combat infantry fighting vehicle 90). Based on this, Steyr-Daimler-Puch Spezialfahrzeug started the conception of the vehicle. However, it was clear that Austria would not order new IFVs in the next years and that the development costs exceeded Steyr's budget.

Therefore, in 1988, a cooperation with the Spanish company Empresa National Santa Barbara S. A. was signed, which resulted in the development being renamed to ASCOD (Austrian Spanish Cooperative Development). Following this, the development of the ASCOD started. The hulls were manufactured in Spain. The ASCOD turrets were made by Steyr in Austria, based on the SP-30 turret design used on the scout version of the Pandur. In 1991, the first prototype was presented in 1991 in Sevilla. It was tested in 1992. Production began in 1996.

Initially, the design was a cooperation between Austrian Steyr-Daimler-Puch AG and the Hellenic ELVO, formerly Steyr Hellas, after signing the contract for the domestically contracted Leonidas 2 APC. The contract, activated in 1988, required Steyr-Daimler-Puch AG to follow Hellenic instructions, and to include parts already produced in Greece, such as the wheels, tracks, and smoke-grenade launchers based on those of the Leopard 1 tank. Also, the secondary MG-3 gun — a variant of the Mauser 30F — was constructed in Greece. Greece withdrew from the program in 1991 after a change of government, requiring Steyr-Daimler-Puch to find a new partner. The IFV in Hellenic service would have the name Alexander the Great. Greece donated its design rights to Steyr-Daimler-Puch as compensation for the 450 IFVs cancelled.

Following the numerous changed requirements during the ASCOD's conception and development phases, the weight increased from the original 18.8 t to 25.2 t and finally 29.0 tonnes. The first prototype was trialled in Norway in 1993/94, but Norway decided to purchase the Swedish CV9030 instead. Following these trials, a slightly updated third prototype was built, essentially equalling the version offered as ASCOD to Austria, Spain and other countries. In 1994, Spain decided to order four pre-series vehicles after successful trials of the prototype. In 1996, Spain ordered 144 vehicles with the designation "Pizarro".

Austria's order for the first 112 ASCOD vehicles, "Ulan" in Austria, was delayed for financial reasons until May 1999. Four pre-series Ulan vehicles were given to the Austrian Bundesheer in April 2001 for the final qualification. The official handover happened in May 2001. In 2002, 28 Ulans were delivered. The next batch of 36 was delivered in 2003. In 2004 the order was completed. In contrast to the original prototypes, the Ulan was completely manufactured in Austria.

The ASCOD effectively brought Austrian and Spanish armour up to date. The Pizarro project was part of the greater Project CORAZA (Project Armour) to replace Spain's M113 APCs, M60A3s, and M110 artillery pieces. By 2005, the Austrian army was equipped with 112 Ulan vehicles and Spain with 144 (123 IFV and 21 C2V).

In 2004, the Spanish Ministry of Defence ordered another 212 Pizarros (170 IFV, 5 C2V, 28 artillery observation, 8 recovery, 1 engineering vehicle) for €707.5 million Euros, with up to 356 units total planned. By 2010 the cost of this second batch had increased to €845m.

=== Deployment history ===
ASCOD entered service with the Spanish and Austrian armies in 2002. Despite being part of ISAF, Spain did not deploy the Pizarro IFV owing to its lack of a mine-protection kit.

== Design ==
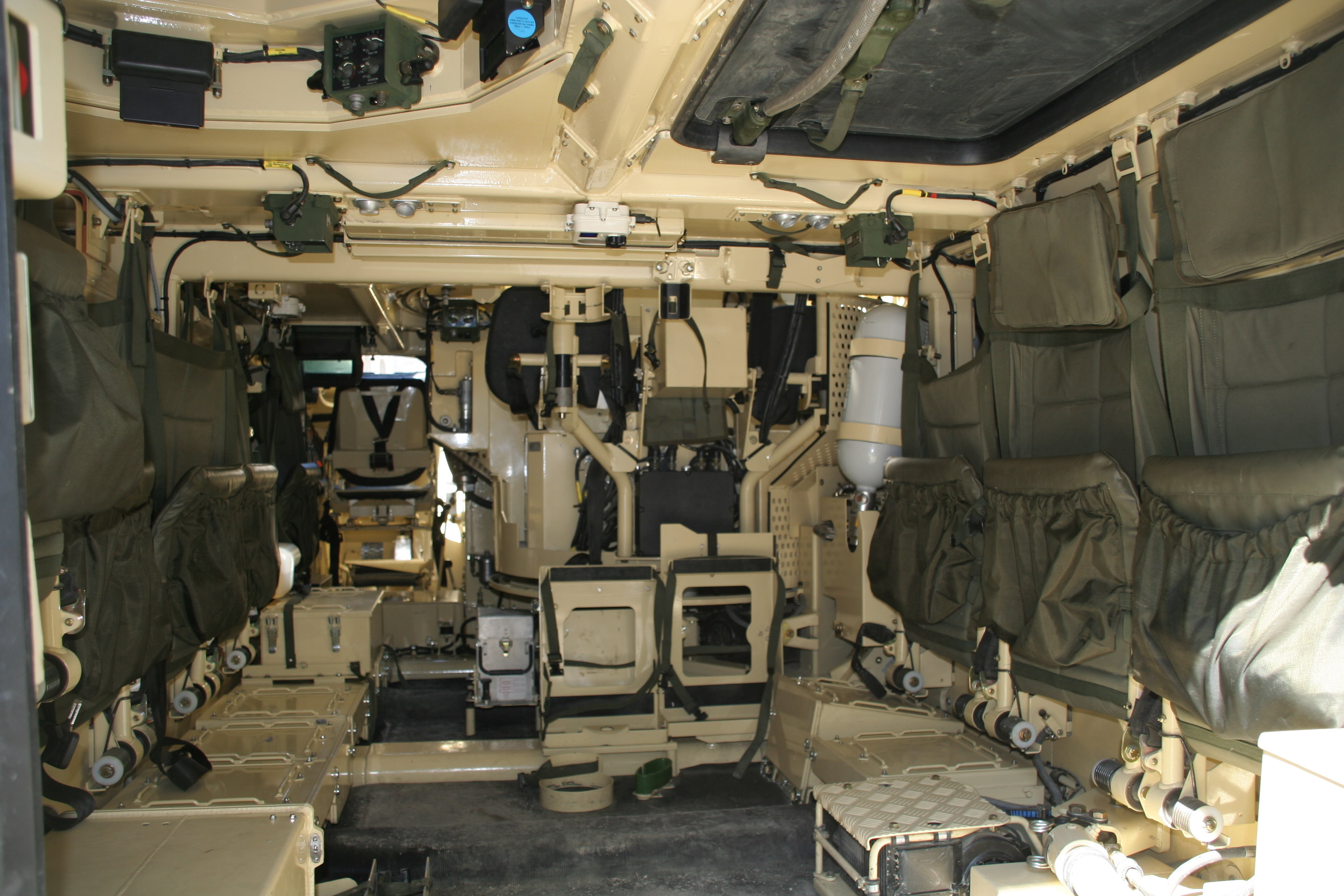
The rear compartment of an ASCOD Ulan

The primary version of the ASCOD is the tracked infantry-fighting vehicle. It follows a conventional layout, featuring a front-mounted engine and a rear compartment for the dismounts. The driver's seat is located at the left hull front. The commander and gunner sit in the slightly off-center–mounted two-man turret. The rear compartment has two hatches on the roof. The Ulan can carry eight dismounts. The Pizarro carries seven.

=== Armament ===
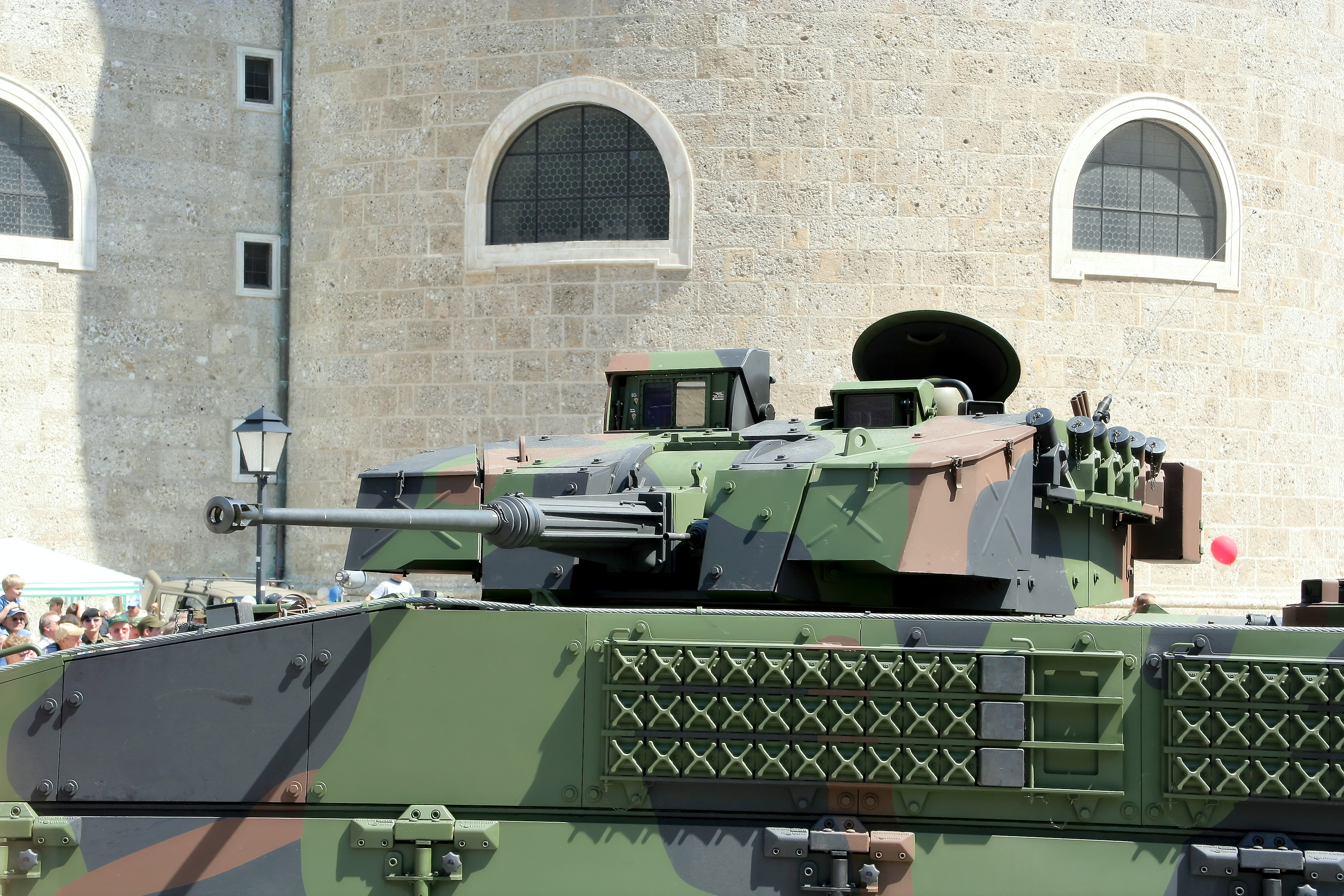
Ulan's SP-30 turret with the MK-30/2 gun

The ASCOD mounts a 30 mm Mauser MK 30 autocannon in a fully traversable electro-mechanical turret. The dual belt-fed 30 mm cannon, electrically stabilized on two planes, is able to fire at a rate of up to 770 rounds per minute and accurately engage targets on the move. As secondary armament, the ASCOD carries a 7.62 mm machine gun. The Spanish Pizarro is fitted with an MG-3 machine gun. The Ulan is fitted with an FN MAG. The Ulan carries 200 rounds of 30 mm and 600 rounds of 7.62 mm in the turret. A further 205 rounds for the 30 mm gun and up to 1,290 for the 7.62 mm machine gun are stored inside the hull. The Pizarro carries 300 rounds of main-gun ammunition.

This armament is comparable to that of the M2 Bradley and the CV90, and performed well in a Norwegian vehicles trial, although it ultimately lost to the Swedish CV90.

==== Optics and fire control system ====
The Ulan is fitted with a digital fire-control system built by Kollsman, utilising some components of the Kürassier A2's fire control system. The gunner's sight is manufactured by Elbit and provides 8× magnification in the day channel. The integrated thermal imager, featuring 2.8× and 8.4× magnification, can be accessed by both the gunner and the commander. The commander has a fixed day-sight with 8× magnification. The Pizarro uses the Mk-10 fire control system from Indra, featuring a full-solution digital ballistic computer, day channel, thermal channel and laser rangefinder. Future versions of the Mk-10 will be fitted with a new VC2 thermal imager.

=== Protection ===
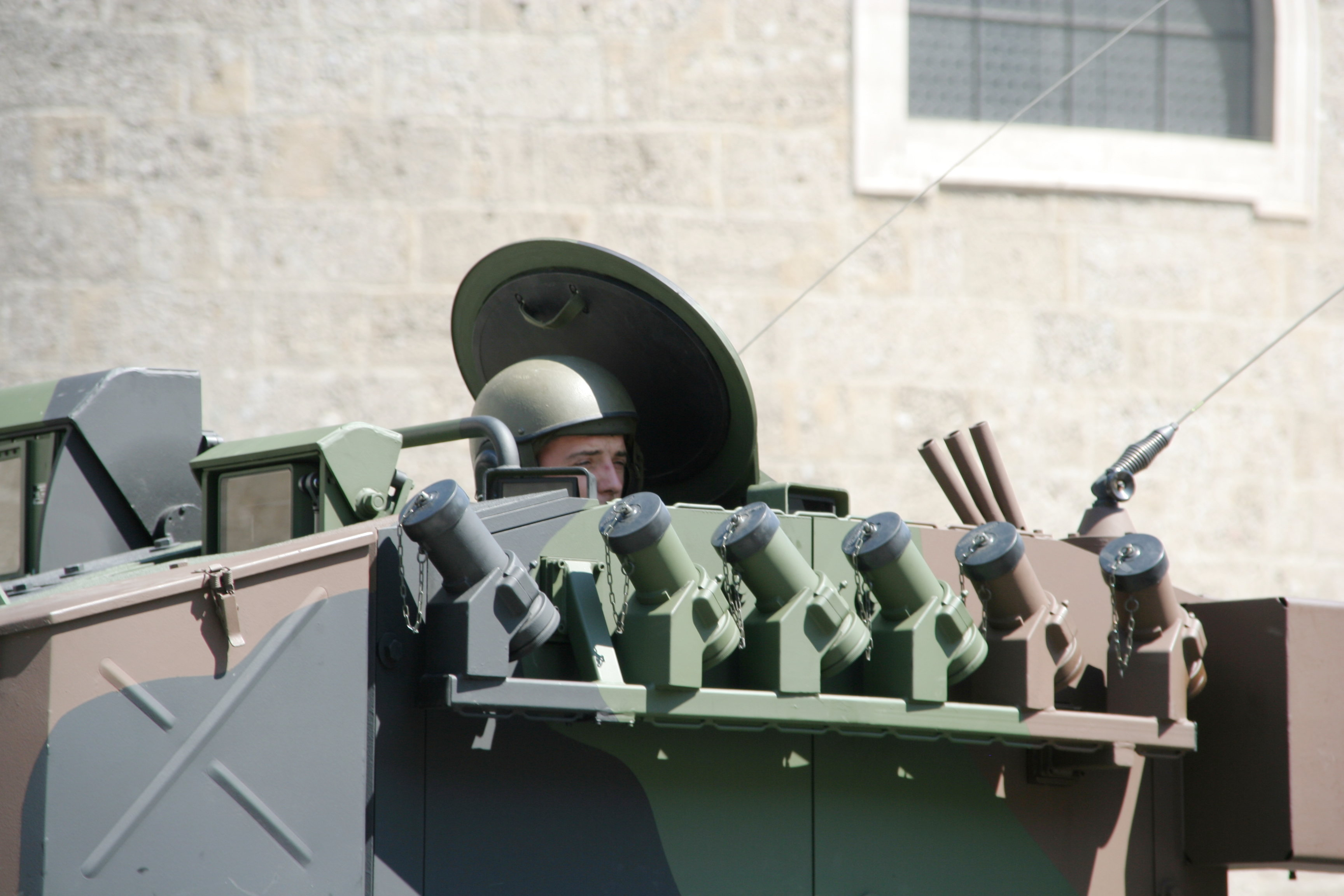
Smoke grenade launchers of the Ulan IFV

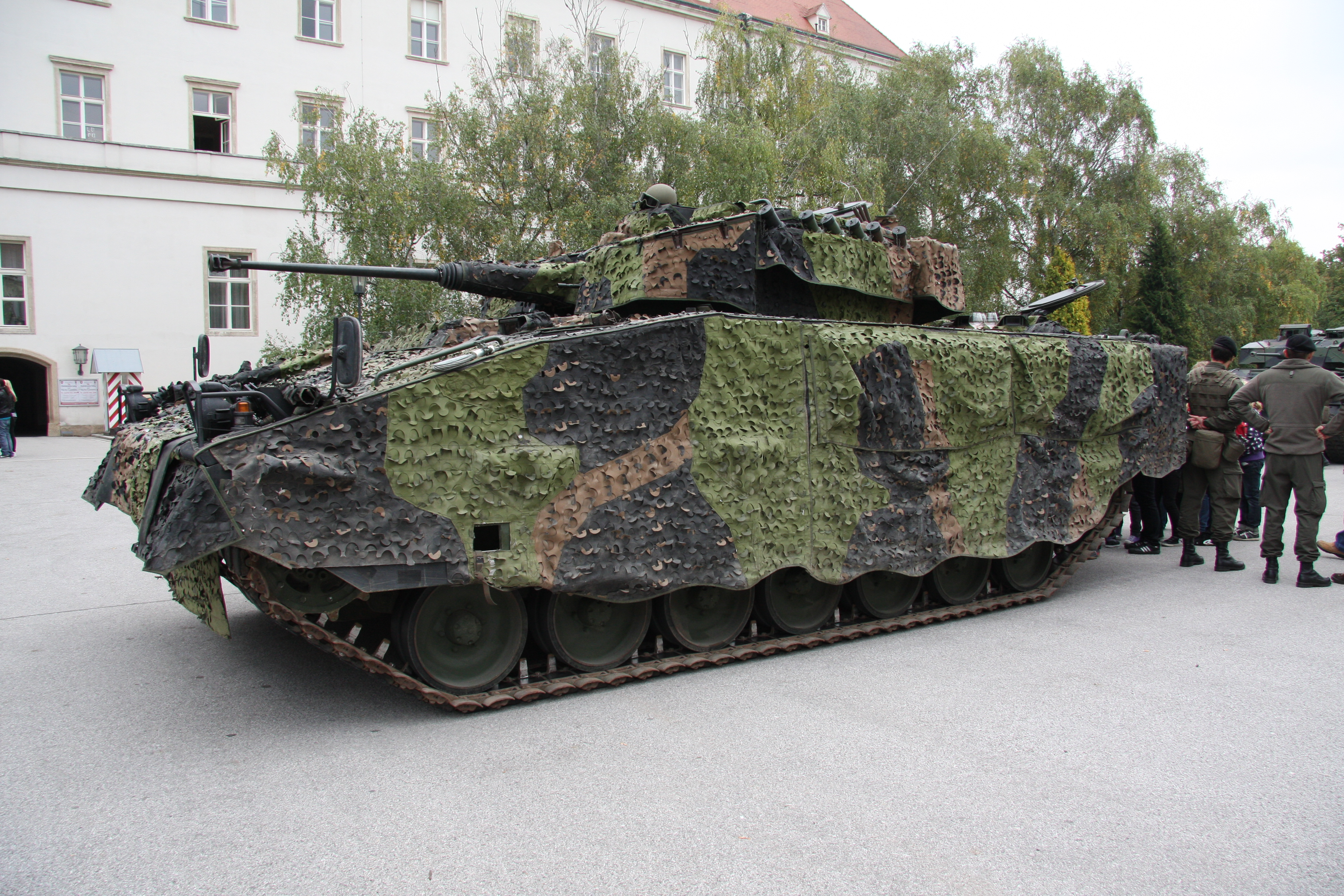
Ulan IFV fitted with the SAAB Barracuda MCS

The ASCOD is constructed of several rolled steel armour plates. The armour provides protection against 14.5 mm armour-piercing ammunition fired from distances of 500 meters or more along the frontal 60° arc, with all-round protection against 7.62 mm ammunition. The turret is fitted with two banks of 76 mm Wegmann multi-purpose grenade launchers. These can fire smoke grenades for self-protection, or high-explosive grenades with fragmentation warhead to a maximum range of 50 metres (160 ft).

The Pizarro is additionally fitted with limited amounts of SABBLIR explosive reactive armour along the frontal arc and might be upgraded with more later. The SABBLIR reactive armour increases protection against shaped-charge warheads as used on rocket-propelled grenades. The Ulan has been fitted with MEXAS composite armour, which increases ballistic protection against up to 30 mm APFSDS rounds fired from a 1,000 m range over the forward 30° arc, and all-round protection against 14.5 mm armour piercing incendiary (API) rounds from a range of 500 m. The Ulan is fitted with spall-liners to minimise casualties in case of armour penetration.

=== Mobility ===
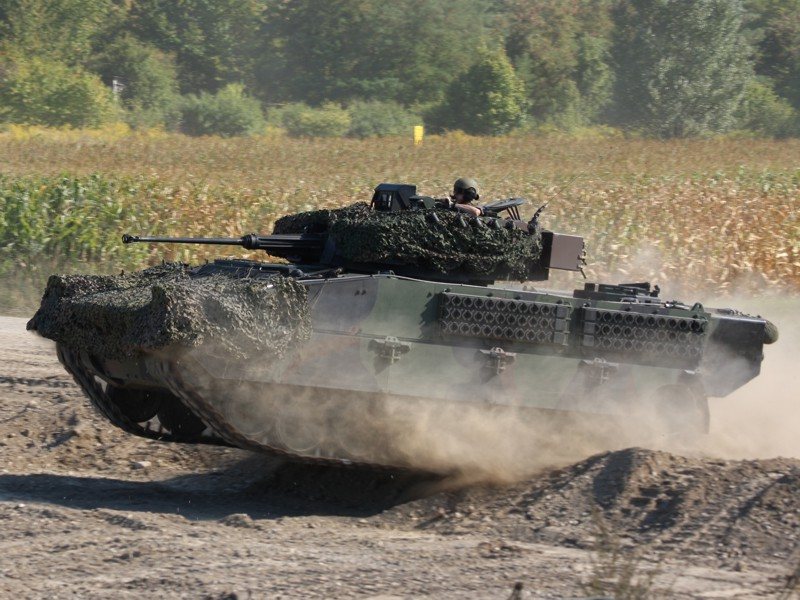
ASCOD Ulan in an army exercise

In terms of mobility, the Spanish Pizarro is fitted with a 600 horsepower (450 kW) MTU SV-183 TE22 engine, while the Austrian Ulan includes a 720 horsepower (540 kW) MTU 8V-199-TE20 engine. These have power-to-weight ratios of 21 and 25, respectively, offering both vehicles excellent mobility. Both versions use a Renk HSWL 106C hydro-mechanical transmission, and suspension — based on torsion bars and rotary dampers — designed and manufactured by "Piedrafita".

The ASCOD uses Diehl type-129 tracks. The Pizarro has a maximum speed of 70 km/h, and a maximum reverse speed of 35 km/h. The ASCOD has a ground-clearance of 450 millimetres (18 in). The Ulan can accelerate from 0 to 50 kilometres per hour (31 mph) in 14 seconds. It can cross ditches of 2.3 metres (7 ft 7 in), climb walls of 950 millimetres (37 in) and ford rivers of 1.2 metres (3 ft 11 in) depth. It is able to drive at 75% gradient and 40% side slope.

== Characteristics ==
=== Spanish version ===
==== Structure ====
System	Country	Vendor	Notes
Hull	Spain	Santa Bárbara Sistemas	
Turret	Spain	Santa Bárbara Sistemas	

==== Sensors ====
System	Country	Vendor	Notes
Fire control system	Spain	Indra Sistemas	
Optronic systems	Spain	Indra Sistemas	

==== Armament ====
System	Country	Vendor	Notes
Cannon	Germany	Mauser	30 mm MK 30/2
Machine gun	Spain	Santa Bárbara Sistemas	7.62 mm MG3 made under license from Rheinmetall

==== Propulsion ====
System	Country	Vendor	Notes
Suspension	Spain	Santa Bárbara Sistemas	For the Spanish version, the rotary damper system is designed and made by Piedrafita.
Undercarriage	Spain	Santa Bárbara Sistemas	
Transmission	Spain	Renk AG	For the Spanish version, a binary transmission SG 850 designed by Sapa Placencia has been incorporated.
Engine	Spain	Empresa Nacional Bazán	Made under license from MTU Friedrichshafen

== Variants and derivatives ==
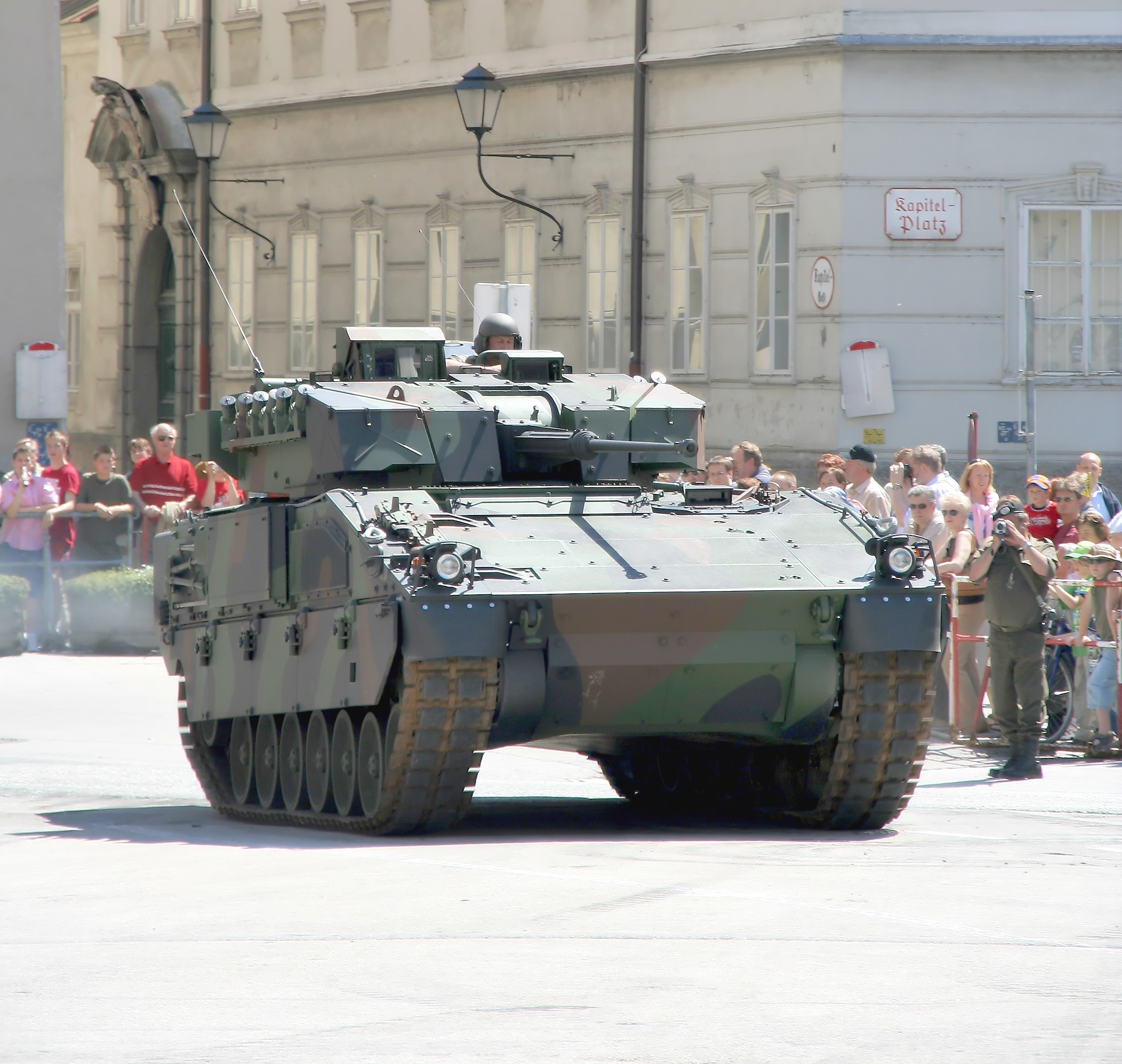
An Austrian Ulan

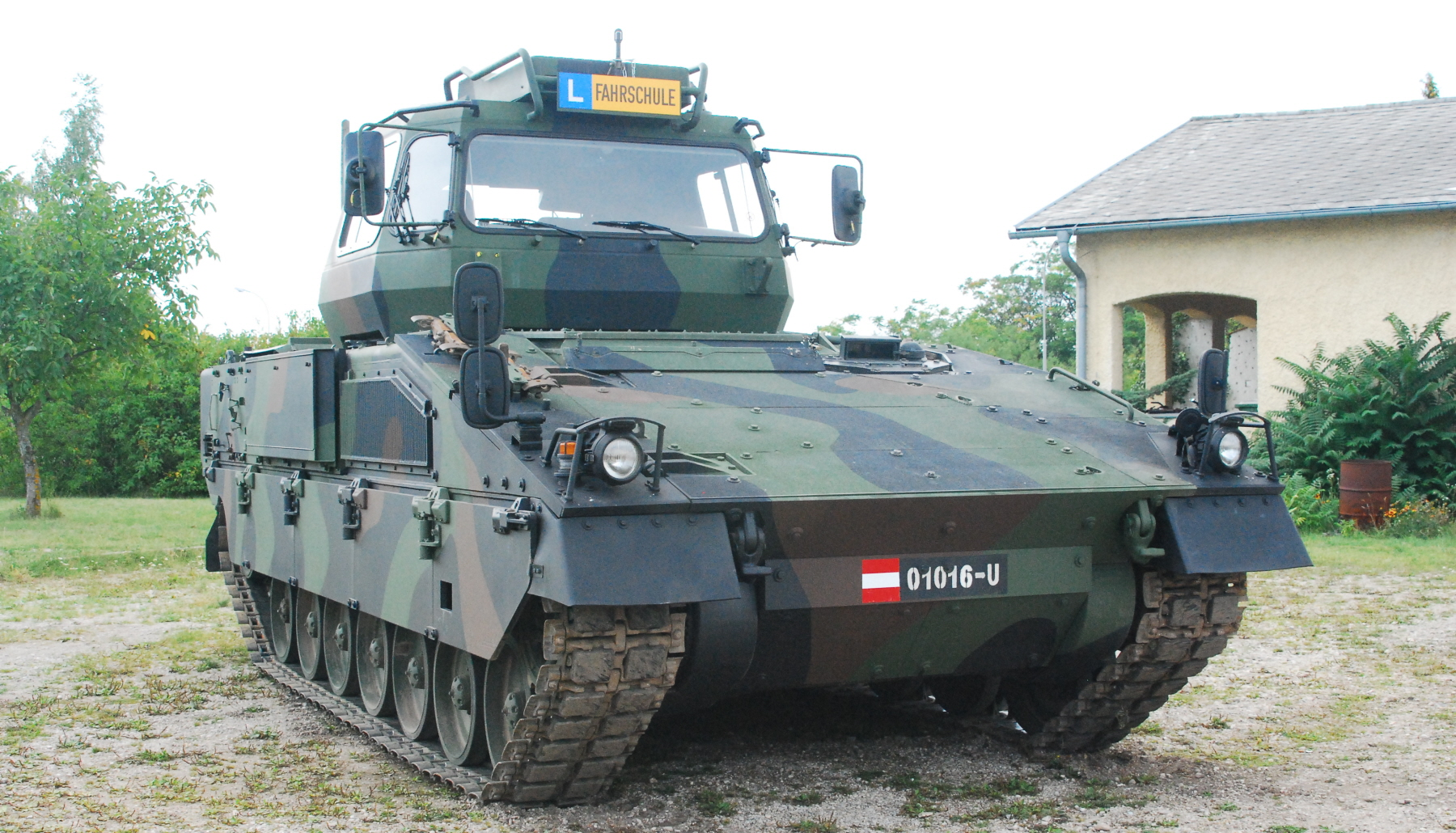
Ulan driver training vehicle

=== ASCOD ===
The ASCOD chassis has been used for a number of vehicles in Spanish service and numerous private ventures developed for the export market. Aside from the IFV version, the ASCOD has been offered as light tank and scout vehicle. The ASCOD Direct Fire light tank can mount a number of different commercial turrets with 105 or 120 mm tank guns. It is expected to weigh about 30 tonnes.

Steyr-Daimler-Puch Spezialfahrzeuge has developed an improved version called Ulan 2. This was never ordered by the Austrian government.

- ASCOD IFV
- Driver training vehicle – ASCOD hull fitted with a fixed superstructure instead of turret.
- ASCOD Scout/Recce – ASCOD fitted with extensive ISTAR equipment and a three-man crew.
- LT-105 Light Tank (ASCOD Direct Fire) – A light tank, designed for the export market, with a 105 mm or 120 mm gun. There are multiple turret options available, made by a different manufacturers: Oto Melara, Cockerill, General Dynamics, and Denel Land Systems (formerly known as LIW).

=== Spanish variant - Pizarro I and Pizarro II ===
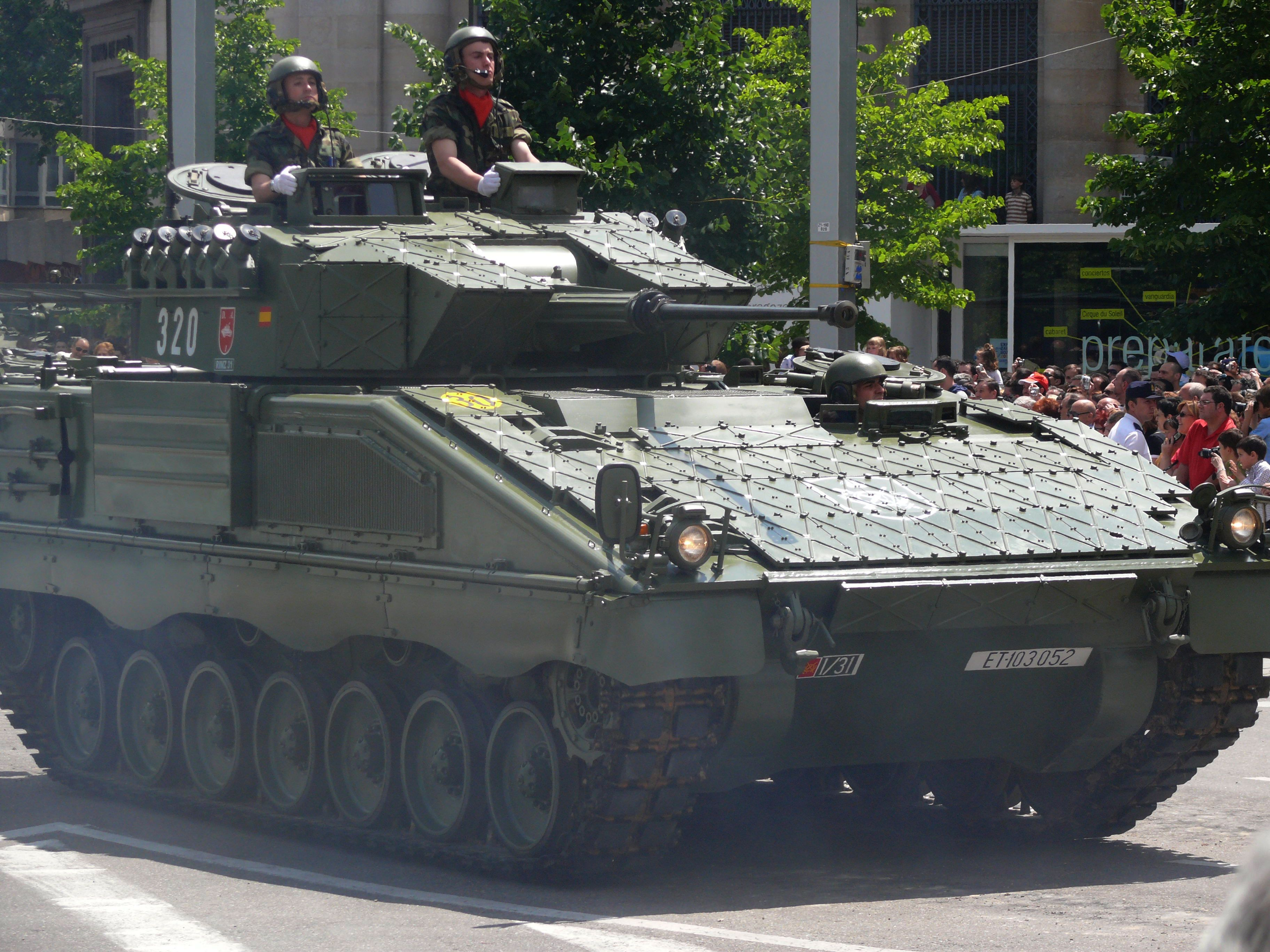
Spanish Pizarro VCI fitted with SABBLIR ERA

The ASCOD Pizarro is built by GDELS Santa Bárbara Sistemas, and operated by the Spanish Army. It exists in multiple variants.

- Operational variants:
  - VCI/C Pizarro – "vehículo de combate infantería/caballería", an infantry / cavalry fighting vehicle
  - VCPC – "vehiculo de puesto de mando", a command vehicle
- Planned variants that didn't enter service:
  - VCOAV – "vehiculo de observador advanzado", an advanced reconnaissance vehicle
  - VCREC – "vehiculo recuperador", an armoured recovery vehicle

=== Austrian variant - Ulan ===
ASCOD Ulan is built by Steyr-Daimler-Puch Spezialfahrzeuge. It includes a more powerful 530 kW engine, and a different fire control system built by Kollsman.

ASCOD Ulan NV

In February 2023, a modernisation of the 112 IFVs was announced. It focuses mostly on the electronic, providing new observation equipment, a digital panel for the driver. For the rest, a renewed electrical turret drive, other revisions to the electrical system and the drive train. The first modernised vehicles were handed over to the Austrian Army on 25th August 2026. The vehicle now is designated Ulan NV (Nutzungsdauerverlängerung; service life extension). The modernization includes new optics (OIP Sensor Systems' FINTIR-MR gunner's sight mounted on the left side of the turret front and Sentinel driver's optics), unified communication systems, changes to the electrical systems and drivetrain.

== Operators ==
=== Current operators ===
Austria (112)
Delivered between 2001 and 2005
- 112 Ulan (IFV)
- 209 additional Ulan in various versions will be ordered.
Spain (261)
In service:
- 204 VCI/C – infantry fighting vehicles
- 21 VCPC – command and communications vehicles
- 36 VCZ – sapper combat vehicles
Details of the orders:
- Initial order of 144 Pizarro in 1996, delivery by 2002:
  - 123 VCI/C – infantry fighting vehicles
  - 21 VCPC – command and communications vehicles
- Second order reduced to 117 Pizarro in 2004 after several cuts, the initial order was for 212 Pizarro, delivered between 2011 and 2015:
  - 81 VCI/C (170 planned initially)
  - 36 VCZ – sapper combat vehicles, only 1 was planned initially
  - Cancelled variants with that order:
    - VCPC, 5 were planned initially
    - VCOAV – forward artillery observer vehicles, 28 were planned initially
    - VCREC – armoured recovery vehicles, 8 were planned initially

== See also ==
- Ajax – (United Kingdom)
- Griffin – (United States)
- M2 Bradley – (United States)
- CV-90 – (Sweden)
- WPB Anders – (Poland)
- Puma (IFV) – (Germany)
- Dardo IFV – (Italy)
- BVP M-80 – (Yugoslavia)
- ELVO Kentaurus – (Greece)
- Tulpar (IFV) – (Turkey)
- Bionix AFV – (Singapore)
- K21 – (South Korea)
- Type 89 IFV – (Japan)
- BMP-3 – (Soviet Union, Russia)
- Lynx KF31/KF41 – (Germany)
- Warrior tracked armoured vehicle – (United Kingdom)
- M8 Armored Gun System – (United States)
- T-15 Armata – (Russia)
