= Saurer 4K 4FA =

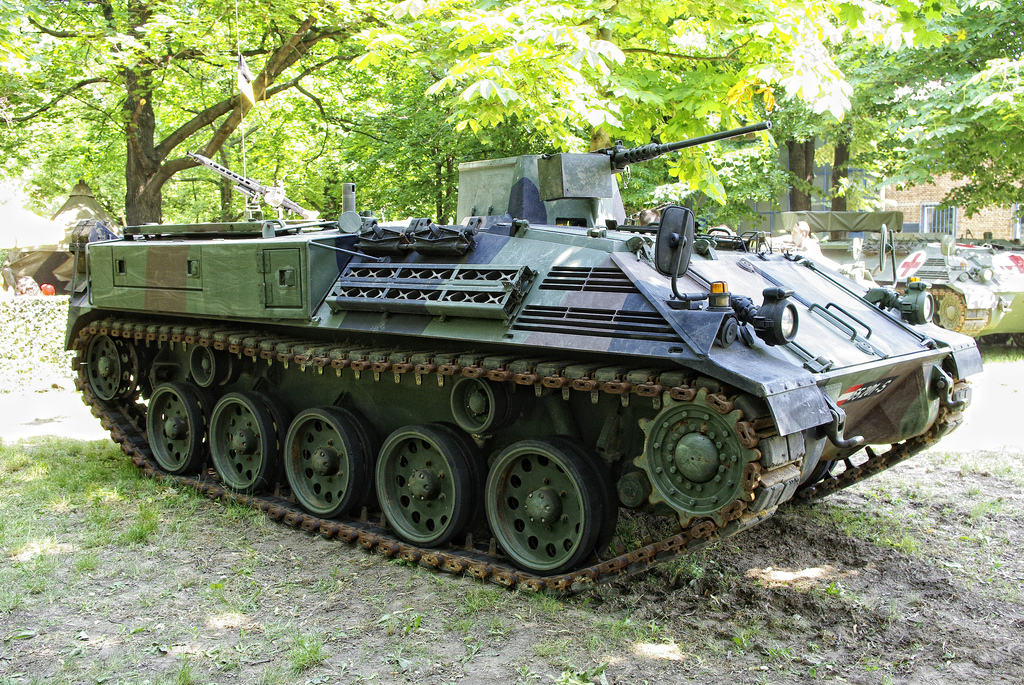
- A Saurer 4K 4FA
- Type: Armoured personnel carrier
- Place of origin: Austria

Service history
- Used by: View in "Operators"
- Wars: Boko Haram insurgency

Production history
- Manufacturer: Saurer-Werk

Specifications
- Mass: 4K 4FA-G2: 15 tonnes 4K 4FA-G1: 12.5 tonnes
- Length: 5.4 m (17 ft 9 in)
- Width: 2.5 m (8 ft 2 in)
- Height: 2.1 m (6 ft 11 in)
- Crew: 2
- Passengers: 8
- Armour: steel
- Main armament: 4K 4FA-G2: 20 mm Oerlikon Contraves cannon Model 204 GK; 4K 4FA-G1: 12.7 mm M2 Browning machine gun
- Engine: 6-cylinder Saurer diesel engine 250 hp (184 kw)
- Suspension: torsion bar, 5 road wheels
- Operational range: 370 km (230 mi)
- Maximum speed: 65 km/h (40 mph)

The Saurer 4K 4FA is an Austrian armoured personnel carrier with caterpillar tracks. It was later replaced by the Steyr 4K 7FA G 127. It went into production in 1961.

== History ==
In 1956, the contractor Österreichische Saurer-Werke from Vienna (which was taken over by Steyr-Daimler-Puch AG in 1970) started development of an armoured personnel carrier. The first prototype, the 3K 3H, was completed in 1958 and the second, the 4K 3H, the following year. They are both powered by a Saurer 3H 200 hp diesel engine.

The next model, the 4K 2P, had a different hull layout, a new torsion bar suspension and was powered by a 250 hp Saurer 2P diesel engine. In appearance it was similar to the first production vehicles which were completed in 1961 and designated 4K 4F. Later production vehicles were the 4K 3FA (230 hp) and the 4K 4FA (250 hp), which differed only in minor details such as their Sauer engines.

A total of 445 production vehicles was delivered to the Austrian Army in the following versions: 30 4K 4F, 211 4K 3FA, 38 4K 3FA-FS, 12 4K 4FA-Fü/FIA, 15 4K 4FA-San, 76 4K 4FA-G2, 60 4K 4FA FüA 1 to 4 series, three 4K 3FA Fül and a number of 4K 3FA GrW1 81 mm mortar carriers which were conversions of earlier vehicles. Production was finally completed in 1969. The vehicle was succeeded in production by a new model, described in detail in a separate entry, called the 4K 7FA which uses the same automotive components as the SK-105 Kürassier light tank also manufactured by Steyr-Daimler-Puch. Production of the 4K FA and SK 105 are complete and all marketing of these has ceased.

In mid-1999, the Austrian MoD awarded Steyr-Daimler-Puch a contract for the supply of 112 ASCOD Ulan infantry fighting vehicles for the Austrian Army. These were delivered from 2002 to 2004 and has now replaced at least part of the current Saurer 4K 4FA APC fleet of the Austrian Army. The 4K 4FA series will remain in service with Austria for some time.

== Description ==
The hull of the Saurer 4K 4FA series armoured personnel carrier is made of all-welded steel armour and is immune to penetration from 20 mm armour-piercing projectiles over its frontal arc. The driver sits at the front of the hull on the left side with the power pack to his right and has a two-piece hatch cover that opens to the left and right, in front of which are three day periscopes. The centre periscope can be replaced by a passive periscope for driving at night.

The gunner sits behind the driver and on the basic model has a cupola with a two-piece hatch cover opening left and right and a single day observation periscope. A standard 0.50 inch (12.7 mm) M2 Browning machine gun is mounted on the forward part of the cupola and most vehicles are fitted with a shield to give limited frontal protection to the gunner. This model is known under the company designation of the 4K 4FA-G1 with its Austrian Army designation being the usMGSPz (Schützenpanzer/Überschweres MG).

The personnel compartment is at the rear of the hull with the eight infantrymen seated on bench seats, four down each side of the hull. The crew in the rear face inwards. The section leader is the first on the right seat and is provided with a day periscope in the forward part of the personnel compartment roof, on the right side. Access to the personnel compartment is by two doors in the rear of the hull. Two hatches over the roof of the vehicle open to the outside. Mounting sockets for the pivot trunnion of an adaptor mount for the MG 42 machine gun are provided on the front, right, left and rear side of the hatch above the personnel compartment.

The suspension is of the torsion bar type with either side consisting of five dual road wheels with the drive sprocket at the front, the idler at the rear and two track-return rollers. The first and last road wheel stations are provided with a hydraulic shock-absorber. The 4K 4FA has no NBC system, night vision equipment or amphibious capability.

== Variants ==
4K 4FA-G2 (Grenadier-Schützenpanzer)

This is similar to the basic 4K 4FA-G1 but is fitted with an Oerlikon Contraves GAD-AOA one-person turret which is armed with a 20 mm Oerlikon Contraves cannon Model 204 GK. This is belt-fed and can be used in both the ground and anti-aircraft roles. The weapon is provided with 100 rounds of ready use ammunition and the empty cartridge cases and links are ejected outside the turret. The 20 mm cannon has an elevation of +70° and a depression of -12°, turret traverse is 360°. Although its company designation is the 4K 4FA-G2 its Austrian Army designation is the MK66SPz Schützenpanzer/Maschinenkanone 66.

4K 4FA-San (Ambulance)

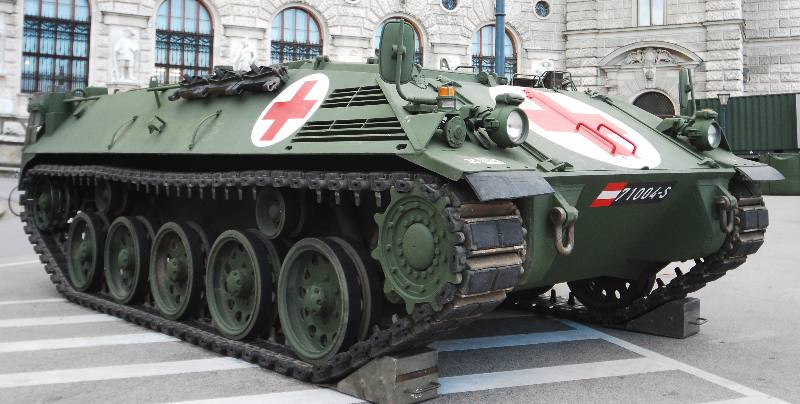
A Saurer APC outfitted for combat medical evacuation

Full designation is 4K 4FA-San (Sanitätspanzer). This model is unarmed and has a crew of two, the driver and the medical orderly, and it can carry four sitting and two stretcher patients. The stretchers are carried in the left side of the hull with the four sitting patients on the bench seat down the right side of the hull, strapped in with waist and shoulder straps.

4K 4F GrW1 81 mm Mortar Carrier (Granatwerfer-SPz)

Mounted in the rear of the troop compartment, firing forwards, is an 81 mm mortar. A 120 mm self-propelled mortar was developed to the prototype stage (GrW2) but never entered service. The vehicle is armed with an 8.1 cm mGrW 82 (Mittelschwere Granatwerfer 82). Minimum range of the mortar is 180 m with maximum range being 5,850 m, normal rate of fire is 6 rounds per minute with maximum rate of fire being 18 to 25 rounds per minute.

81 mm Multiple Rocket Launcher

This is an APC with an Oerlikon Contraves 81 mm rocket launcher mounted on a turntable over the rear troop compartment. It is understood that these vehicles have now been phased out of service.

Schützenpanzer A1/LWT

This is the section vehicle for the MBDA Mistral man-portable surface-to-air missile systems in the Pz1FAL batteries.

ELVO Leonidas

Version of the vehicle used by the Greek Army and the Cypriot National Guard with a few modifications. It is armed with an M2 Browning Machine Gun and powered by a 320 hp engine. It was produced from Greek vehicle manufacturer ELVO from 1981. ELVO developed an upgrade called Leonidas 2 which entered production in 1986. All vehicles in Greek service have been upgraded to that standard.

Future Tank Destroyer

The small scale (1:10) mockup of the tank destroyer at the Panzerhalle at the Museum of Military History, Vienna

Only a mockup version was made in 1960. The Austrian Armed Forces wanted a Future tank destroyer based on the APC Saurer's hull, and wanted to put the oscillating turret from the AMX-13 light tank on it (possibly the 105mm gun version). This idea would go on to become the SK-105 Kürassier later on.

== Operators ==
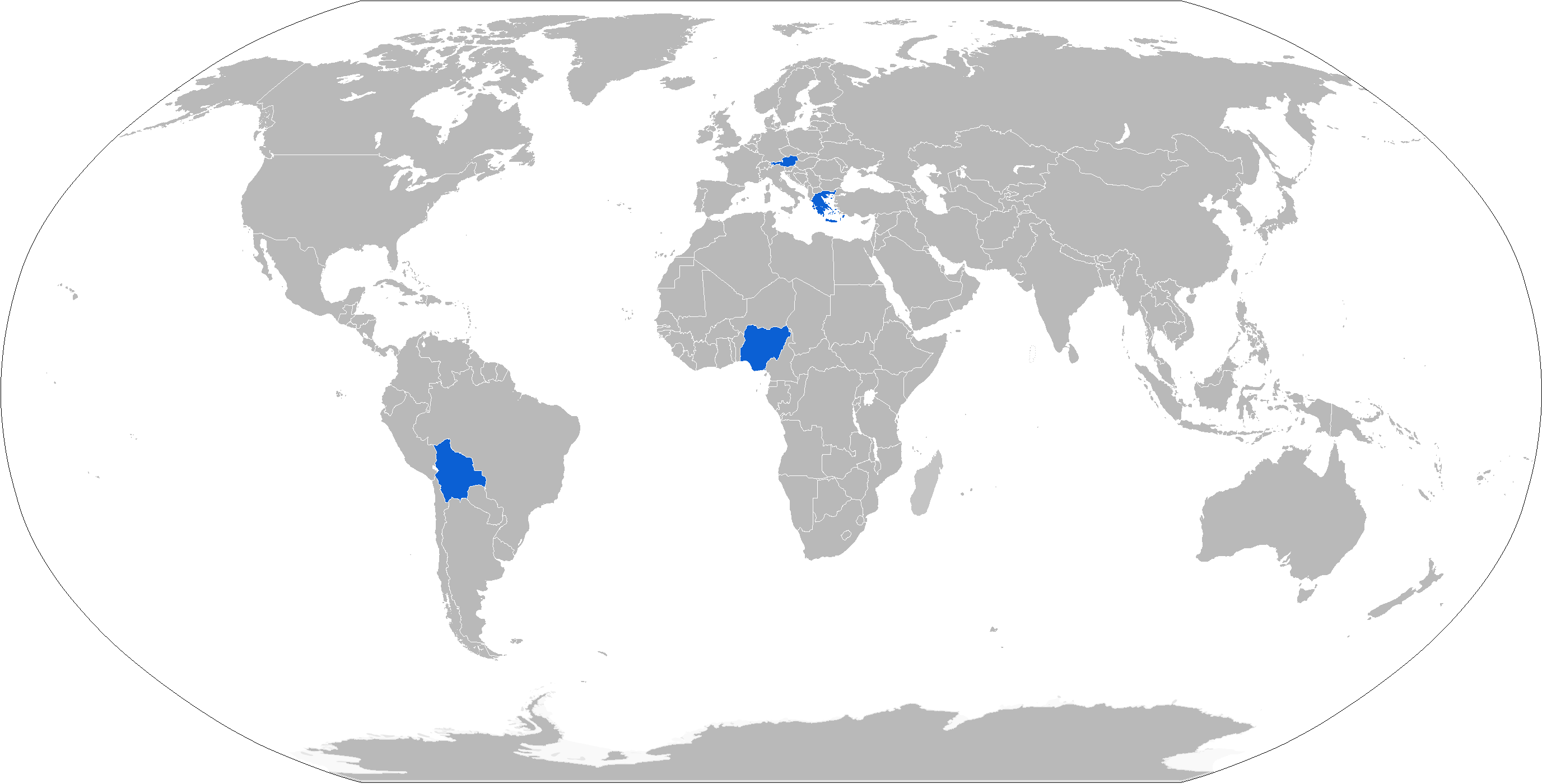
Map of 4K 4FA operators in blue

- Austria - As the Saurer 4K4FA
- Bolivia - As the 4K4FA-SB20 Greif-Recovering vehicle
- Cyprus - As the ELVO Leonidas 2
- Greece - As the ELVO Leonidas
- Nigeria: 250
  - Boko Haram

== See also ==
- (United States) M113
- (France) AMX-13
- (Greece) ELVO Leonidas-2
- (Austria) SK-105 Kürassier
- (Germany) Schützenpanzer Lang HS.30
