= ELVO Leonidas-2 =

Leonidas-2
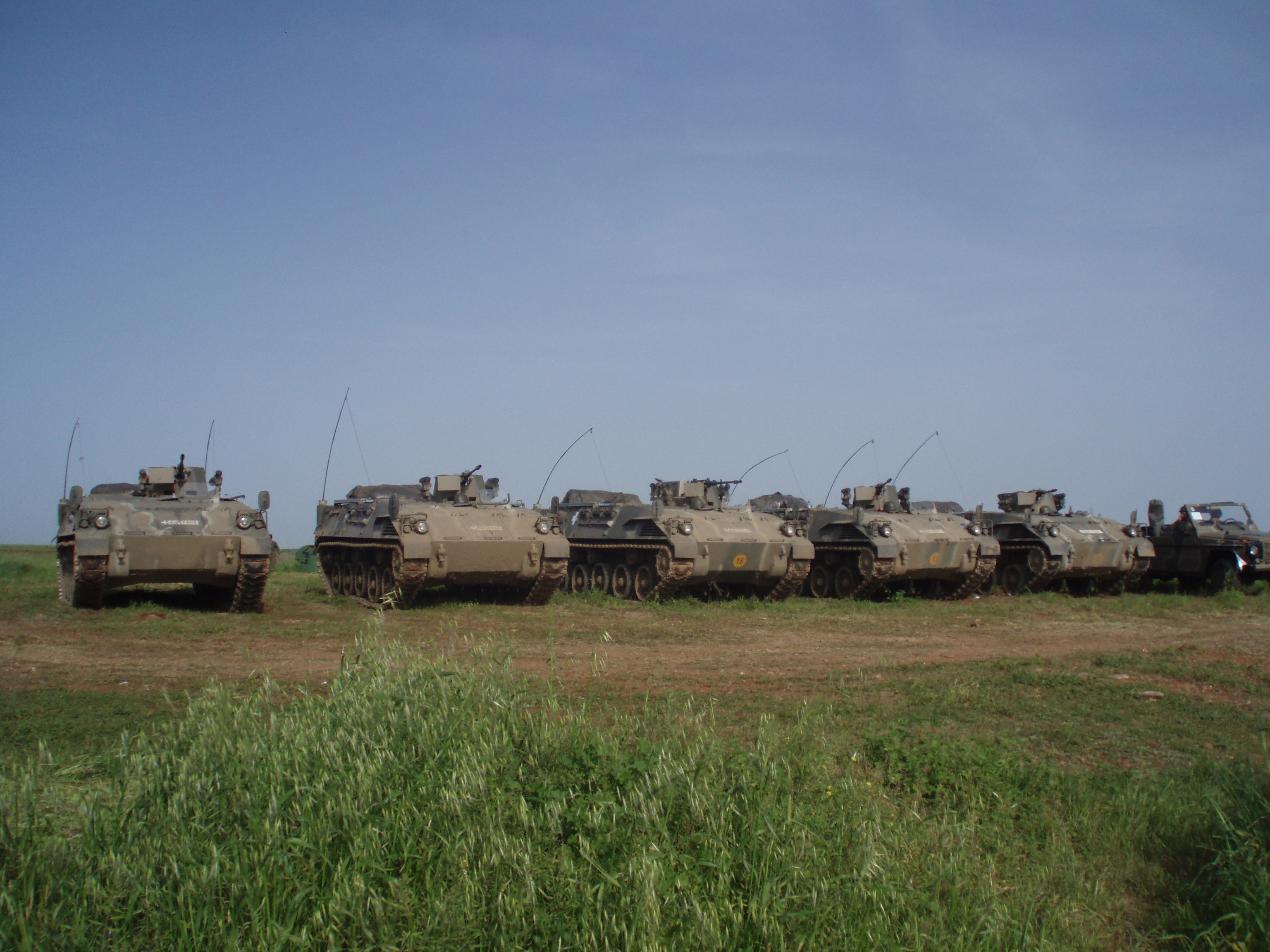
- Leonidas APCs of the Hellenic Force in Cyprus (ELDYK)
- Type: Armoured personnel carrier
- Place of origin: Greece

Service history
- In service: 1981–present
- Used by: Greece; Cyprus; North Macedonia

Production history
- Produced: Austria 1976; Greece 1981-2001
- No. built: c. 800

Specifications
- Mass: 14.8 t
- Length: 5.87 m (19 ft 3 in)
- Width: 2.50 m (8 ft 2 in)
- Height: 1.7 m (5 ft 7 in)
- Crew: 2
- Passengers: 8
- Armour: welded steel 26-32 mm front 15 mm sides and rear
- Main armament: 1 x 12.7 mm MG; 1,500 rounds
- Secondary armament: 1 x 7.62 mm MG3
- Engine: Steyr 7FA inline 6-cylinder water-cooled diesel 320 hp (745 kW) at 2,300 rpm
- Power/weight: 21.62 hp/t
- Transmission: ZF Synchronized, 6 gears forward and 1 reverse
- Suspension: torsion bar
- Ground clearance: vertical obstacle: 0.8 m trench: 2.1 m
- Operational range: 520 km (320 mi)
- Maximum speed: 63 km/h (39 mph)

The Leonidas-2 represented an effort made by the Greek vehicle manufacturer ELVO to produce an advanced armoured personnel carrier (APC) of its own. It is named after Leonidas, king of the ancient city-state of Sparta. The first version of the Leonidas was the Austrian Saurer 4K 4FA armoured personnel carrier built with minor modifications by the Greek company (then known as Steyr Hellas S.A.) from 1981 until 1987. Initial production was essentially assembly, however Greek content progressively increased. The APC had a 320 hp engine and a weight of 14.8 tons.

== Design and development ==
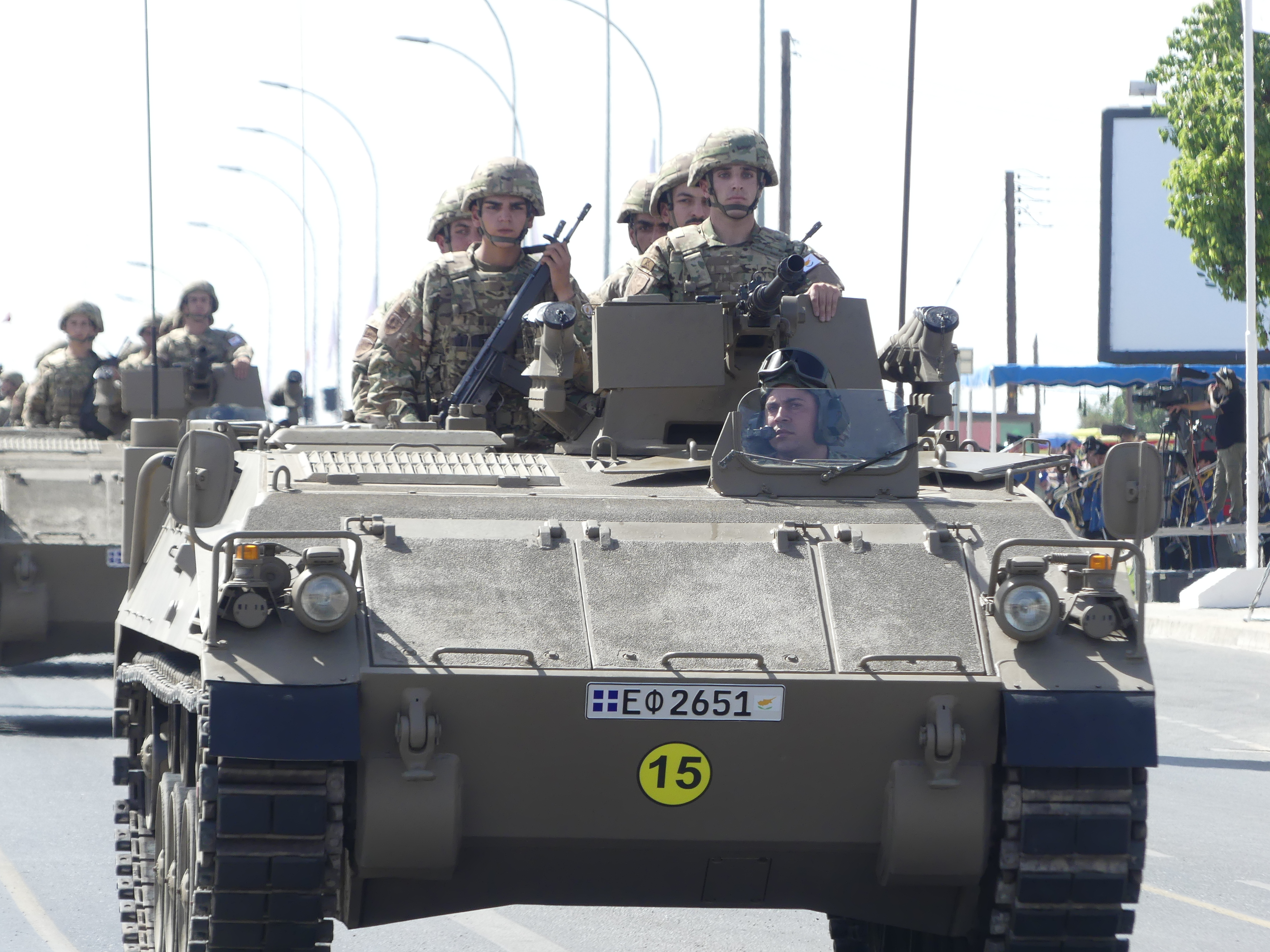
ELVO Leonidas-2

The 'Leonidas-2' development involved extensive modification of the previous model. This was done by ELVO in 1987 with the aim to essentially develop it as an armoured infantry fighting vehicle (AIFV). The new version had a weight of 18.8 tons and it used a 450 hp engine; maximum speed was 70 km/h. The construction of the turret became a matter of debates involving interested companies (three versions with different types of turrets were proposed, while there were "demands" that the turret should constructed by EBO), but the vehicle was finally produced without a turret. About 700 were produced, including a number exported to Cyprus. Plans to develop the vehicle further as 'Leonidas-3' for different roles were abandoned in 2002, as the vehicle was considered outdated. ELVO continued efforts for a modern AIFV development, starting cooperation in 1988 with Steyr-Daimler-Puch of Austria on a joint development, but soon pulled out due to the high cost of the vehicle compared to the Greek Army specifications (Santa Bárbara Sistemas of Spain continued development with the Austrian company, resulting in the ASCOD Ulan/Pizarro AIFV). Eventually ELVO worked on its own, developing a completely new armoured infantry fighting vehicle, the Kentaurus in 1998.

== Leonidas production ==
The table below shows the production run based on the history of publicly known orders, as published in the press. The total appears as 700 vehicles, yet the company ELVO in its internet site mentions a total production of "about 800 vehicles"

Production history
Year	Origin of order	Quantity	Notes
1981	Greece	2	Leonidas 1 version. 2 prototypes delivered from Austria for testing
1981	Greece	100	Leonidas 1 version. Delivered between 1982 and 1983, originally only assembled in Greece, progressively Greek participation increased (including manufacture of certain parts)
1986	Cyprus	76	Leonidas 2 version. 16 built in Austria, 40 in Greece.
1987	Greece	344	Leonidas 2 version. Built in Greece.
1993	Cyprus	56	Leonidas 2 version. Built in Greece.
1995	Cyprus	65	Leonidas 2 version. Built in Greece.
1998	Greece	57	Leonidas 2 version. Built in Greece.
2001	North Macedonia (donation from Greece)	10	Leonidas 2 version with new automatic transmission. Built in Greece.
Total		700	503 vehicles delivered to Greece. 197 vehicles delivered to Cyprus.

== Operators ==
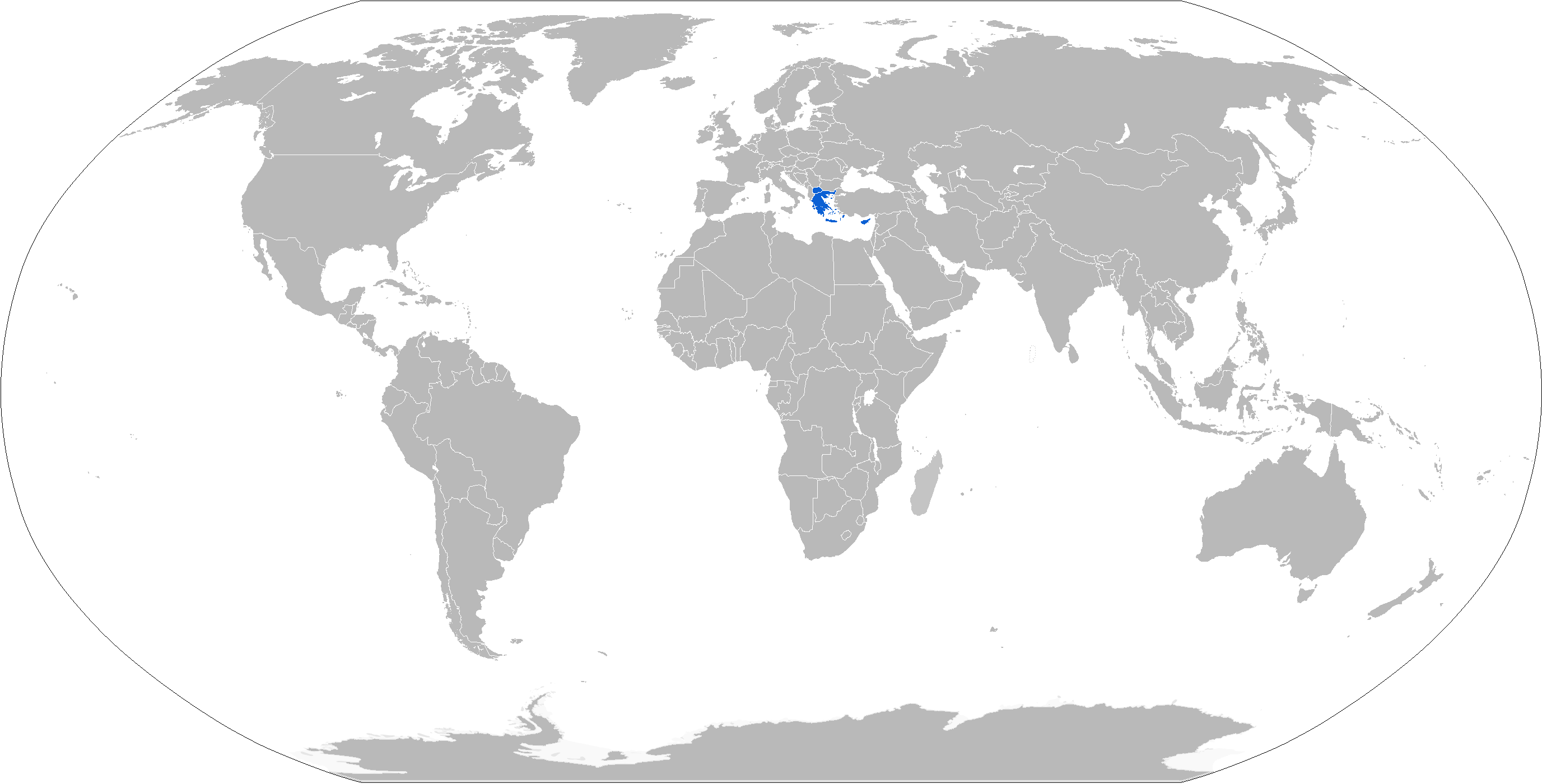
Map of ELVO Leonidas operators in blue

=== Current operators ===
- Cyprus - 197
- Greece - 495
- North Macedonia - 10

== See also ==
- ELVO Kentaurus
- Saurer 4K 4FA
