= ELVO Kentaurus =

Greek infantry fighting vehicle

Kentaurus ΚΕΝΤΑΥΡΟΣ
- Type: Infantry fighting vehicle
- Place of origin: Greece

Production history
- Designed: 1996–1998
- Manufacturer: ELVO

Specifications
- Mass: 19.8 t
- Length: 5.98 m (19 ft 7 in)
- Width: 2.55 m (8 ft 4 in)
- Height: 2.45 m (8 ft 0 in)
- Crew: 3
- Passengers: 8
- Armour: welded steel
- Main armament: 30 mm EBO cannon with 396 rounds
- Secondary armament: 7.62 mm coaxial with 1,600 rounds
- Engine: MTU 6V 183TE22 diesel (11,000cc/725kg); 420 hp at 2,300 rpm
- Power/weight: 21.2 hp/t
- Suspension: (Lever Arm) Rotary Damper
- Ground clearance: 0.42 m (1 ft 5 in)
- Operational range: 500 km (310 mi)
- Maximum speed: 75 km/h (47 mph)

Kentaurus is an armored infantry fighting vehicle (AIFV) designed and developed by the Greek vehicle builder ELVO. Its history is connected with the need for an advanced AIFV by the Greek Armed Forces. The vehicle takes its name from the Greek word for Centaur the creature from Greek mythology. After aborted efforts including Leonidas-2 variants and other attempted improvements and joint developments, ELVO worked entirely on its own, on a new design according to the specifications given at the time by the Hellenic Army. The resulting AIFV developed by the Greek company, named 'Kentaurus' ('ΚΕΝΤΑΥΡΟΣ'), was officially introduced at the Defendory Arms Exhibition in Athens in 1998. It features a 420 hp MTU Diesel engine, 30 mm EBO cannon and 7.62 mm machine-gun (built on Mauser and Rheinmetall designs), Pyrkal smoke-grenade launchers, Toxotis computerized fire control system and KUKA turret. The crew is 3+8, maximum speed on roads is 75 km/h and maximum weight is 19.8 tons.

Despite successful tests by the Greek army, its approval, and an initial agreement in 2003 for an order of 140 vehicles, its fate is uncertain due to subsequent cutbacks in relevant military spending, and evaluation of cheaper alternatives. In 2009 the Greek army signed an MoU for 450 BMP-3s but as of 2012 the contract was frozen and the Greek army is still looking for 500 IFVs to replace the ageing BMP-1 and the purchase of 500 Kentaurus IFV's is being considered.

== Description ==
The hull is made of welded steel. The engine is placed in the front-right compartment, with the driver in the front-left. The turret follows and then the troop compartment. The driver accesses his position either from a roof hatch or from the troop compartment. The commander is situated in the E-8 KUKA 1-man turret behind the driver. The troop compartment is accessed from two rear-doors, as well as from two roof-hatches. The squad leader sits alone, with the rest of the men at the sides in a 3-man and 4-man rows. The troops have two optical periscopes for situational awareness. The interior of the vehicle has been designed to permit comfortable movement for men of up to 1.90m height.

The vehicle has steel armor, concentrated mostly to the front arc. The front arc is rated as proof to APDS-T rounds of 30x173mm calibre at 1,500 meters, of 25x137mm at 400 meters and of 20x139mm at 30 meters. The sides are proof to 12,7mm AP rounds at 100 meters and fully proof to 7,62mm rounds. The vehicle is proof to artillery shrapnel at 15 meters, and against 2,5 kg mines. The vehicle is capable of taking additional passive and reactive armor, and is offered with the option of spall liners inside the vehicle.

The MTU 183TE22 engine has a dry weight of 725 kg and requires 19 kg of oil and 15 kg of cooling fluid to operate. It can operate without problems at temperatures from -46 to +52 °C. It can be accessed from a large hydraulic assisted hatch and be removed from the vehicle in 15 minutes. Attached to it is an ZF LSG-1000 gearbox, with a RENK SU-1201C final transmission. There are 6 forward gears and 2 reverse.

The 1-man KUKA E-8 turret is made of welded steel and has a low profile. It weighs 1,585 kg. Initially it was offered with a Bushmaster II gun of 30mm calibre, but the Kentaurus prototype had a licence-produced Mauser Mk30, also of 30mm, by Hellenic Defence Systems. There are 100 APDS-T and 100 HE-I rounds ready to use in the turret, with a further 196 stored inside the hull. The turret traverses at 30° per second, and the gun elevates from -10° to +45°, also at a speed of 30°/second. All movement is done electrically, with a back-up manual system also present. Secondary armament is a MG3A1 machine gun of 7.62mm. It can be replaced with a 12.7mm heavy machine gun or a 40mm automatic grenade launcher. The turret also has the provision for the addition of AT or AA launchers.

== See also ==
- List of modern armoured fighting vehicles

== Sources ==
- Simon Dunstan, 'Modern Tanks & AFV's' (Vital Guide), Airlife Publishing (2002).
