= Hellenic Vehicle Industry =

Greek automobile manufacturer

Hellenic Vehicle Industry S.A.
- Native name: Greek: Ελληνική Βιομηχανία Οχημάτων Α.Β.Ε.
- Romanized name: Elliniki Viomihania Ohimaton
- Type: S.A.
- Industry: Automotive
- Predecessor: Steyr Hellas S.A. (1972-1987)
- Founded: June 1972; 54 years ago in Thessaloniki
- Headquarters: Thessaloniki, Thessaloniki, Central Macedonia, Greece
- Area served: Europe
- Key people: Papakostas Demetrios (Chairman and CEO)
- Products: Buses; Trucks; Military vehicles Regular vehicles (starting in 2021)
- Revenue: ▼€108.2 million (end 2012)
- Operating income: ▼€17.16 million (end 2012)
- Net income: ▼€19.27 million (end 2012)
- Total assets: ▲€69.56 million (end 2012)
- Total equity: ▲€31.99 million (end 2012)
- Owner: SK Group (100%)
- Number of employees: 380 (2015)
- Website: www.elvo.gr
- Footnotes; Hellenic Vehicle Industry did not release financial results in 2012, 2013, or 2014

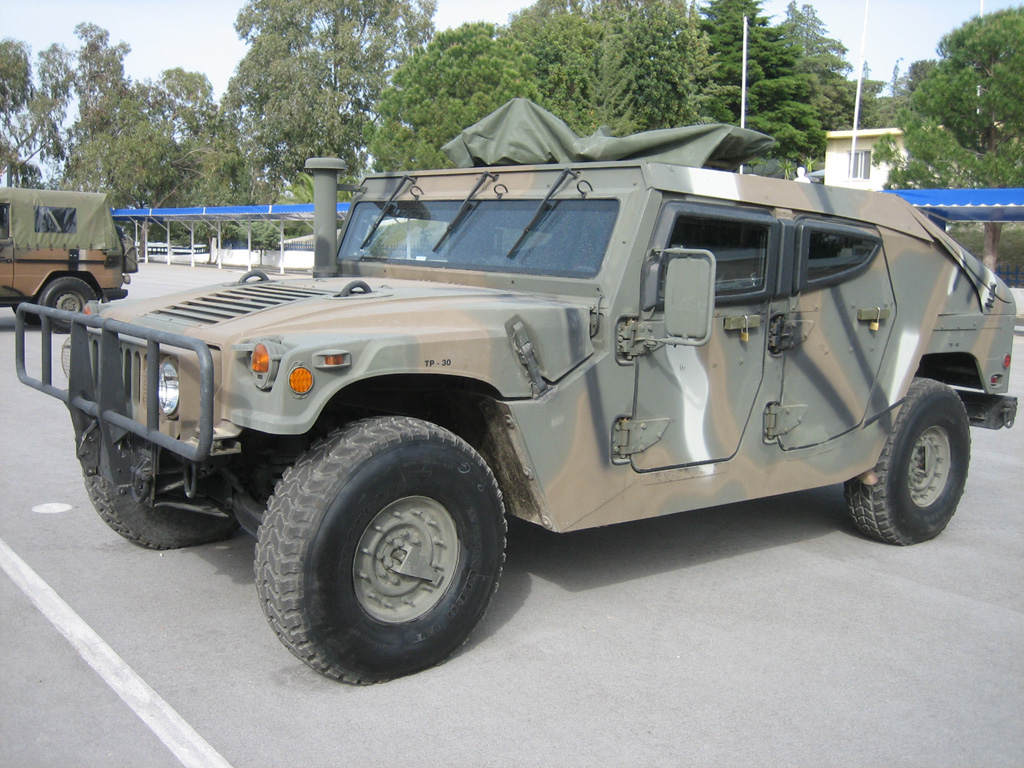
ELVO HMMWV M1114GR (2003), developed for Hellenic Vehicle Industry by Plasan Sasa.

Hellenic Vehicle Industry (ELVO, also spelled in English as ELBO) is a Greek manufacturer of civilian and military vehicles based in Thessaloniki, Greece.

== History ==
The Hellenic Vehicle Industry started business as Steyr Hellas S.A. assembling and manufacturing trucks, motorbikes and farm tractors (Steyr and Puch models). Significant orders for trucks and buses by the Greek Army and state authorities soon gave momentum to the company. The tractor division declined in the 1980s, as the company focused on military vehicles. In 1986 it changed its name to Hellenic Vehicle Industry S.A..

The Greek company's first original designs were a 3-tonne truck in 1980, which was not industrially produced, and a military bus (chassis and body) in 1981. In the same year it undertook the construction of "its own" Leonidas Armored Personnel Carrier, Steyr’s 4K 7FA model built with minor modifications, again with progressively increasing local content. In 1987 Hellenic Vehicle Industry introduced Leonidas-2, this time with significant modifications of its own. Hundreds were built, while a number of different versions were proposed.

In the years that followed, Hellenic Vehicle Industry became a major producer of military and civilian trucks for a variety of uses (all based on Steyr models), engines (Steyr types, many for export to the Austrian company itself), military jeeps (Mercedes-Benz G-Class under licence), customized vehicles and machinery, and buses, with significant exports. Production of buses usually involved body construction on imported chassis. Only a few models actually included complete ELVO chassis design and construction, among them the Midas and Europe models of 1993, and a number of military bus types. ELVO-bodied Scania L113 buses exported to Trans-Island Bus Services, Singapore in 1996 were welcomed by that country’s press as the first low-floor buses in the wider region.

A number of ambitious plans for company development and new products were not realized, as the state character of the company linked it to effects from government changes and mismanagement. Although it pulled out of a 1988 agreement with Steyr for an Armored Infantry Fighting Vehicle Development, Hellenic Vehicle Industry rather surprised many in 1998, introducing a particularly advanced Armored Infantry Fighting Vehicle of its own design and development, named Kentaurus.

The vehicle has not been ordered by the Greek military due to reduced budgets. Another step towards original developments was its initiative for the creation of a light sports car, which was assigned to TWT, an engineering company created in Germany by Greek engineer Dimitris Vartziotis, with facilities in Germany and Greece. The prototype of the ELVO Aletis, meaning "tramp" in Greek, an attractive car designed by Pininfarina with Volkswagen engine, was introduced in the Internationale Automobil-Ausstellung in Frankfurt in 2001, but never produced.

In 2000, Hellenic Vehicle Industry was partly privatised, when the Greek Mytilineos metal and engineering group acquired 43% and undertook the company management. The company faced severe financial problems due to reduced orders in 2009, after production, in cooperation with a number of Greek companies, of 140 Leopard 2 Hel main battle tanks under licence of Krauss-Maffei Wegmann (KMW), had been completed. The management of the company reverted to the Greek state in 2010.

The Greek state petitioned to put Hellenic Vehicle Industry into receivership in January 2014. By 2015, the company was in the process of being dissolved. However, in April 2015 the dissolution had been frozen as the Greek government sought to find a private buyer for the company, citing its strategic importance to the Greek defence industrial base.

In 2019, Greece government launched an international tender to sell the share of Hellenic Vehicle Industry. In 2020, the sale of the company to an Israeli-interest consortium that comprising Plasan Sasa Ltd, Naska Industries – SK Group and Hellenic businessman Aristidis Glinis appears to have successfully concluded. According to sources, it was announced the Israeli consortium was deemed the highest bidder in the public tender for the sale of ELVO’s assets and Israeli consortium committed to invest between 95 and 135 million euros in ELVO over the next five years.

The acquisition was completed on 14 February 2021 with the Israeli consortium taken over control of the production of ELVO vehicles, which Hellenic Armed Forces were interested. They are considering to produce military vehicles and regular vehicles for Greece and later Europe, like ELVO Aletis which was a concept car in the 2010s.

In 2025, SK Group acquired the entirety of the company.

== Gallery ==
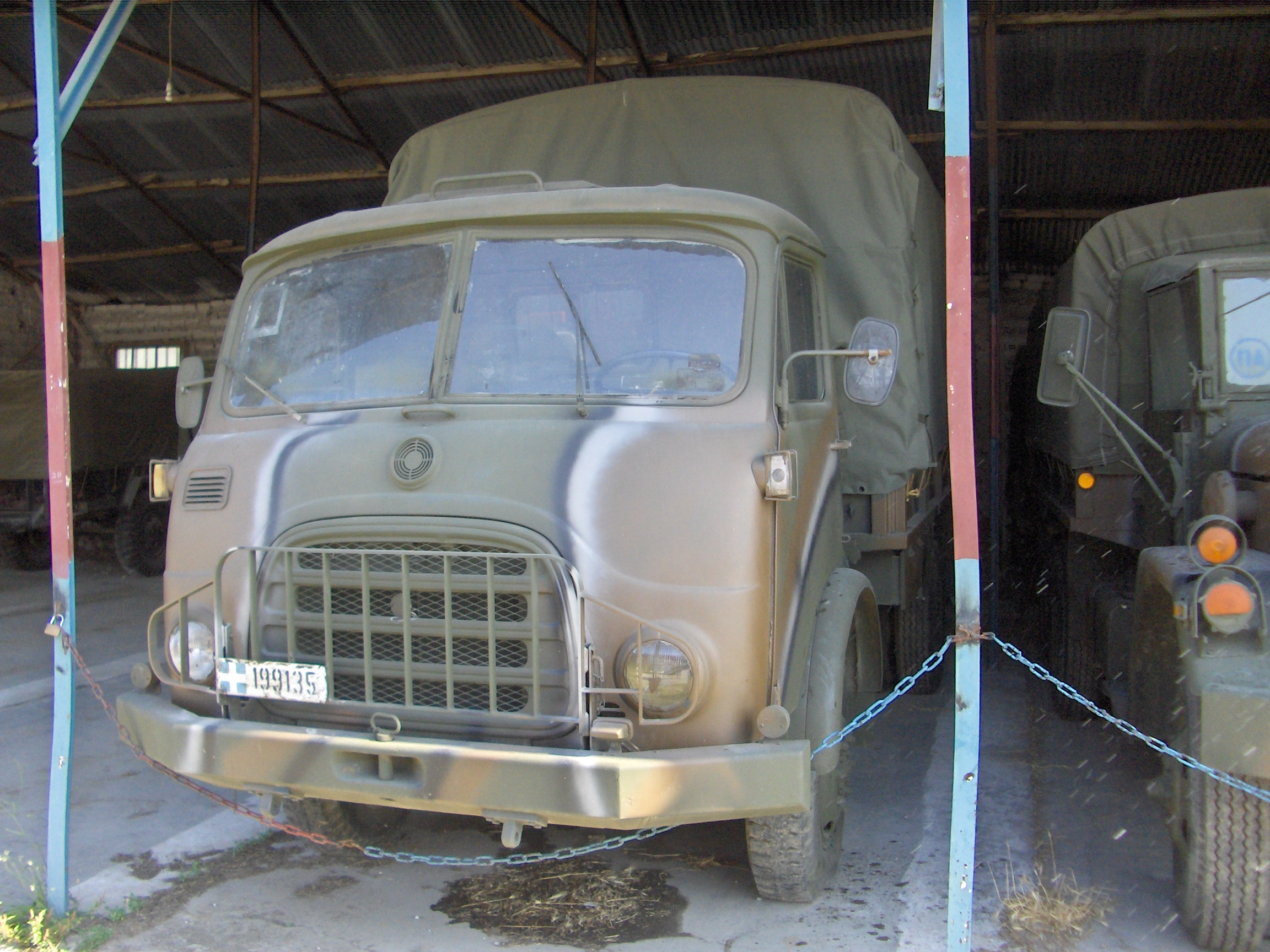
Steyr Hellas 680MH off-road military truck (4x4)

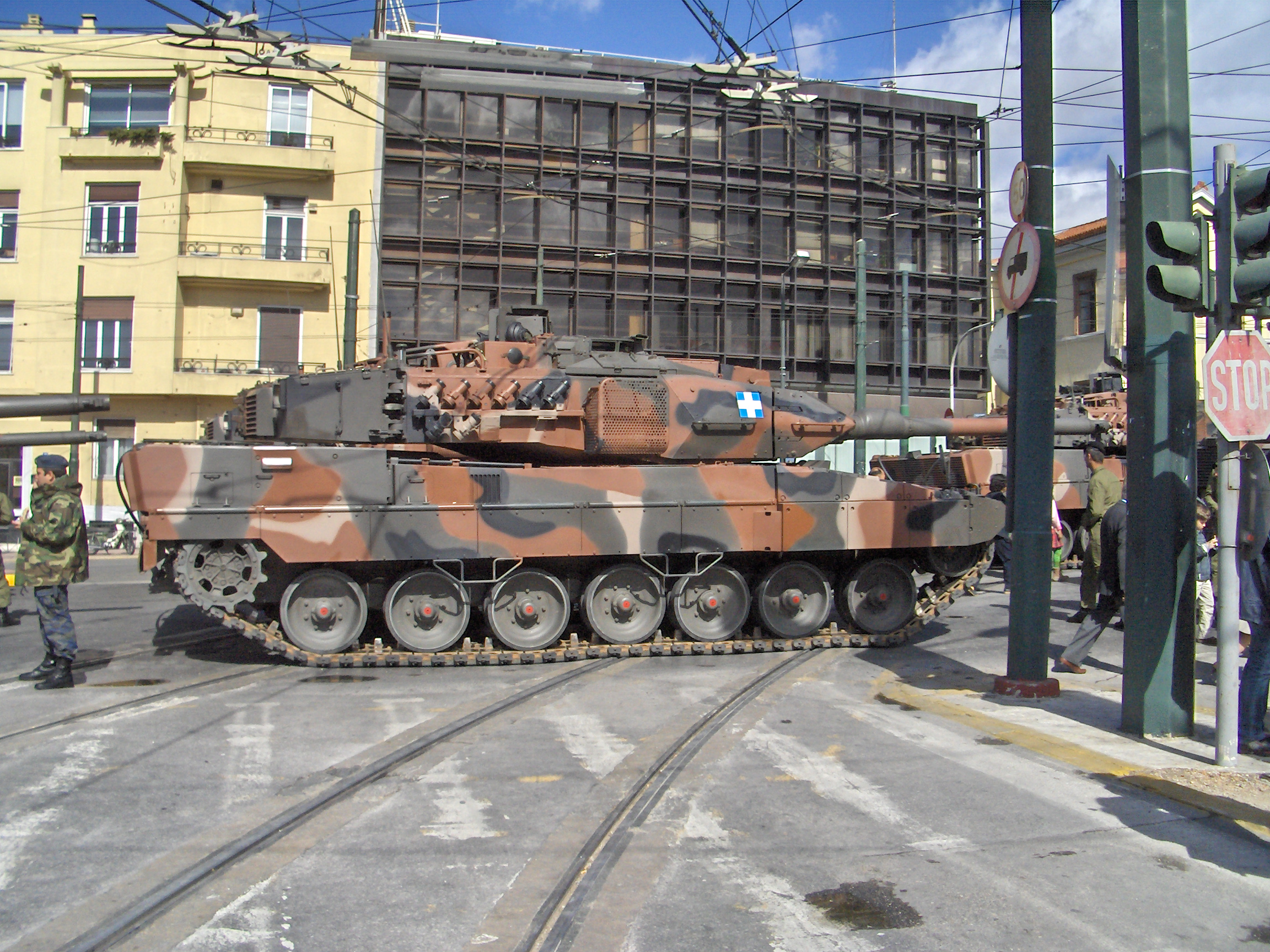
Leopard 2A6 HEL (built under license)

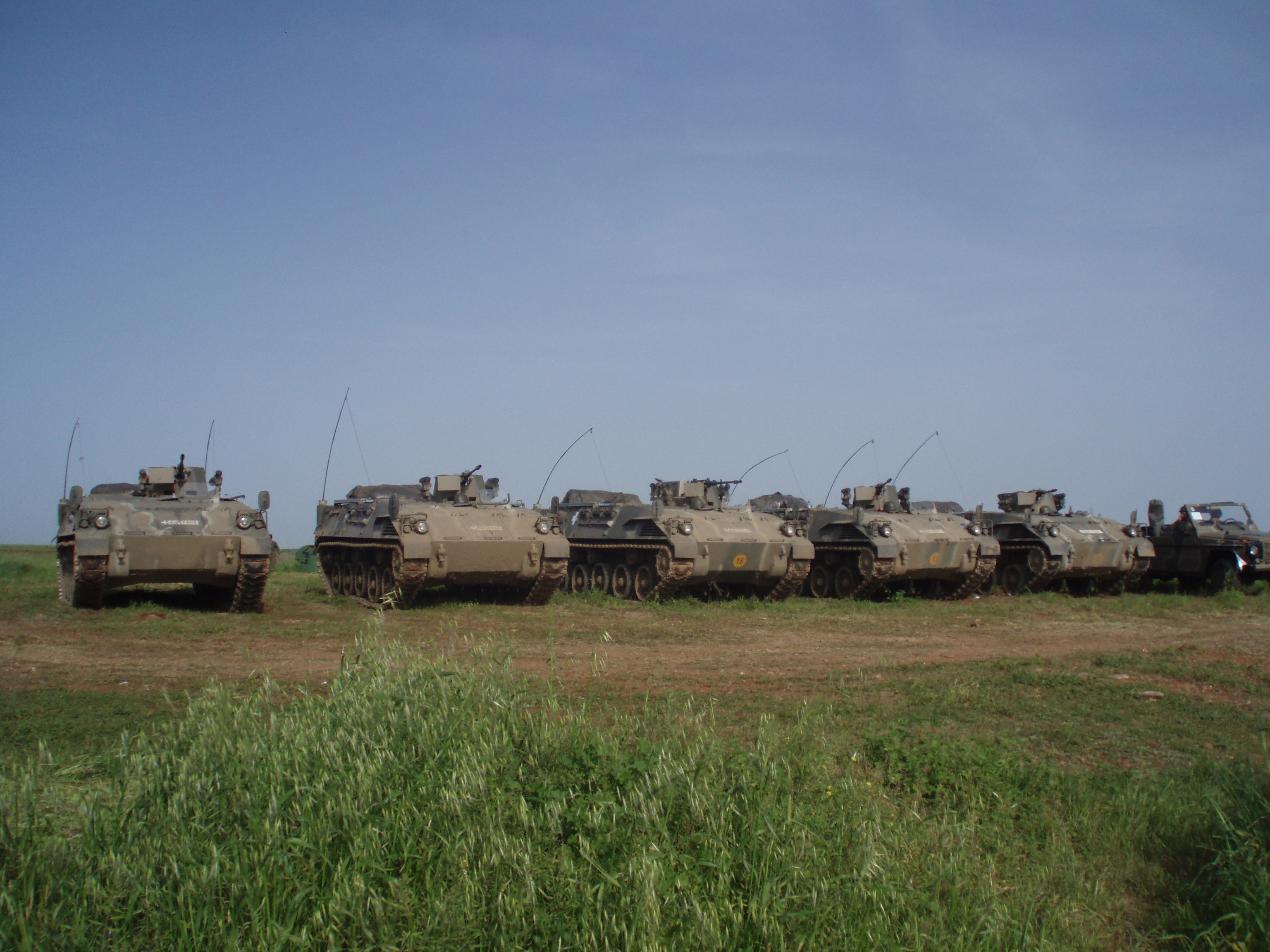
ELVO Leonidas-2

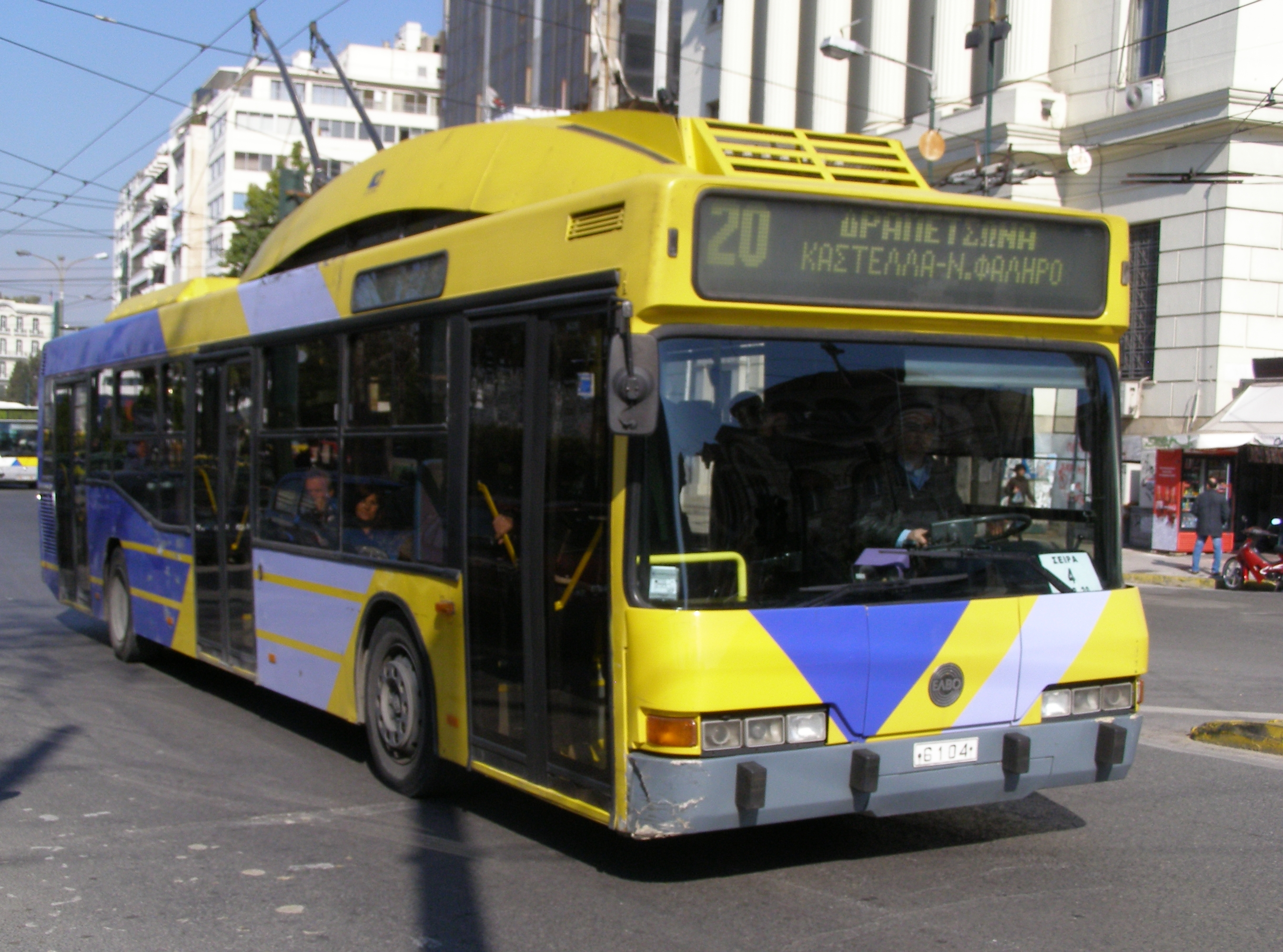
ELVO-Neoplan Trolleybus

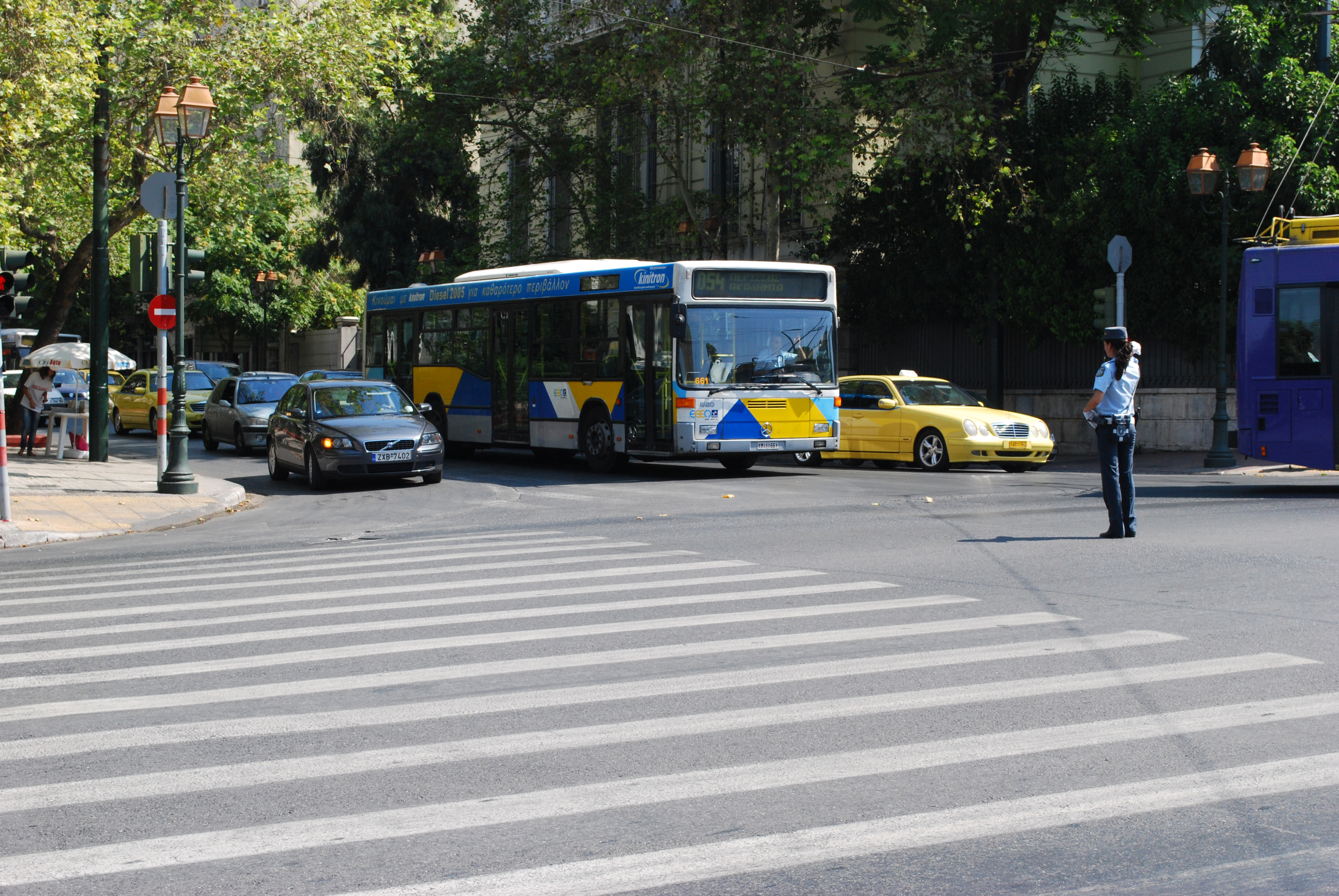
ELVO C97 (Mercedes-Benz O405N)

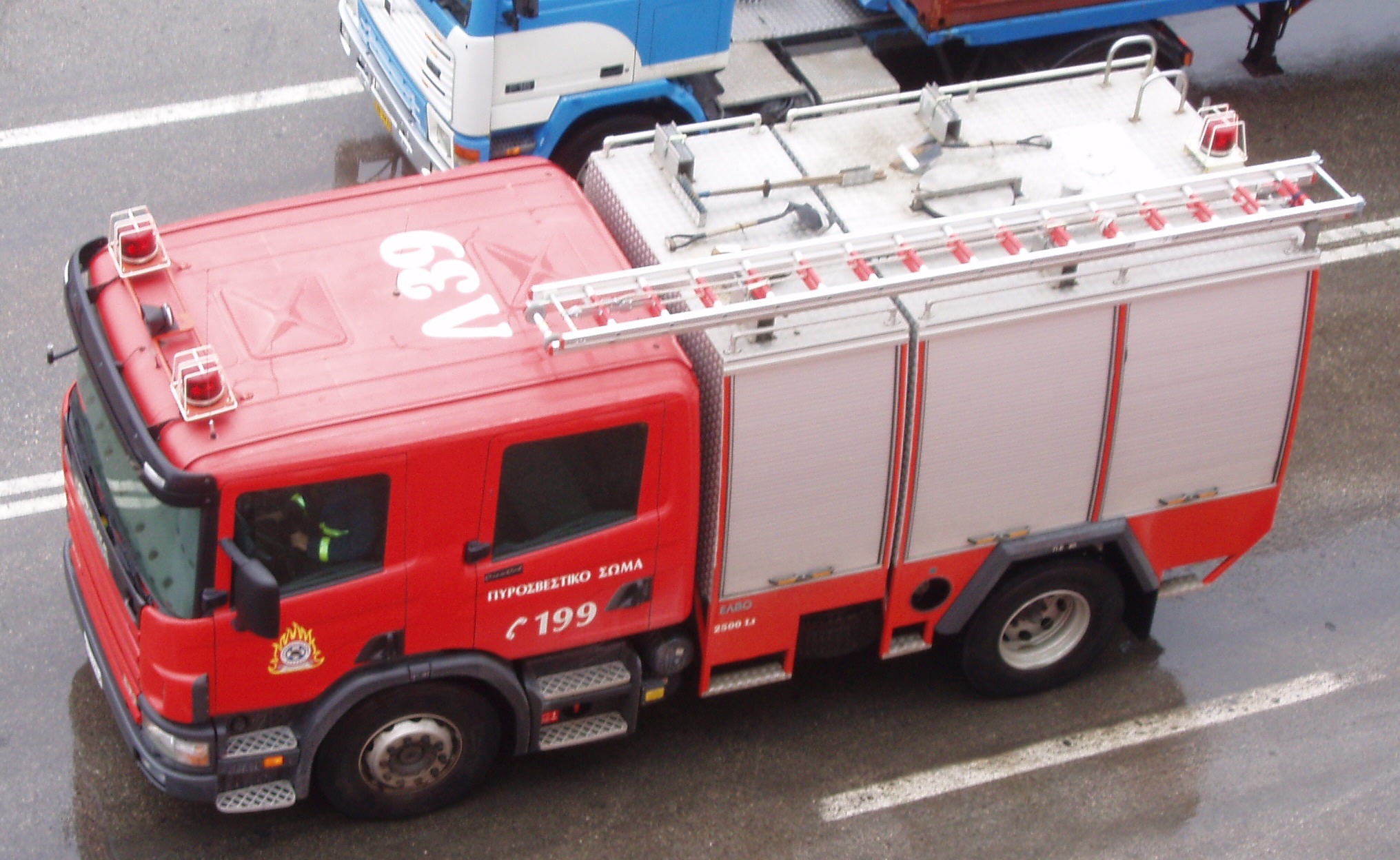
Fire engine

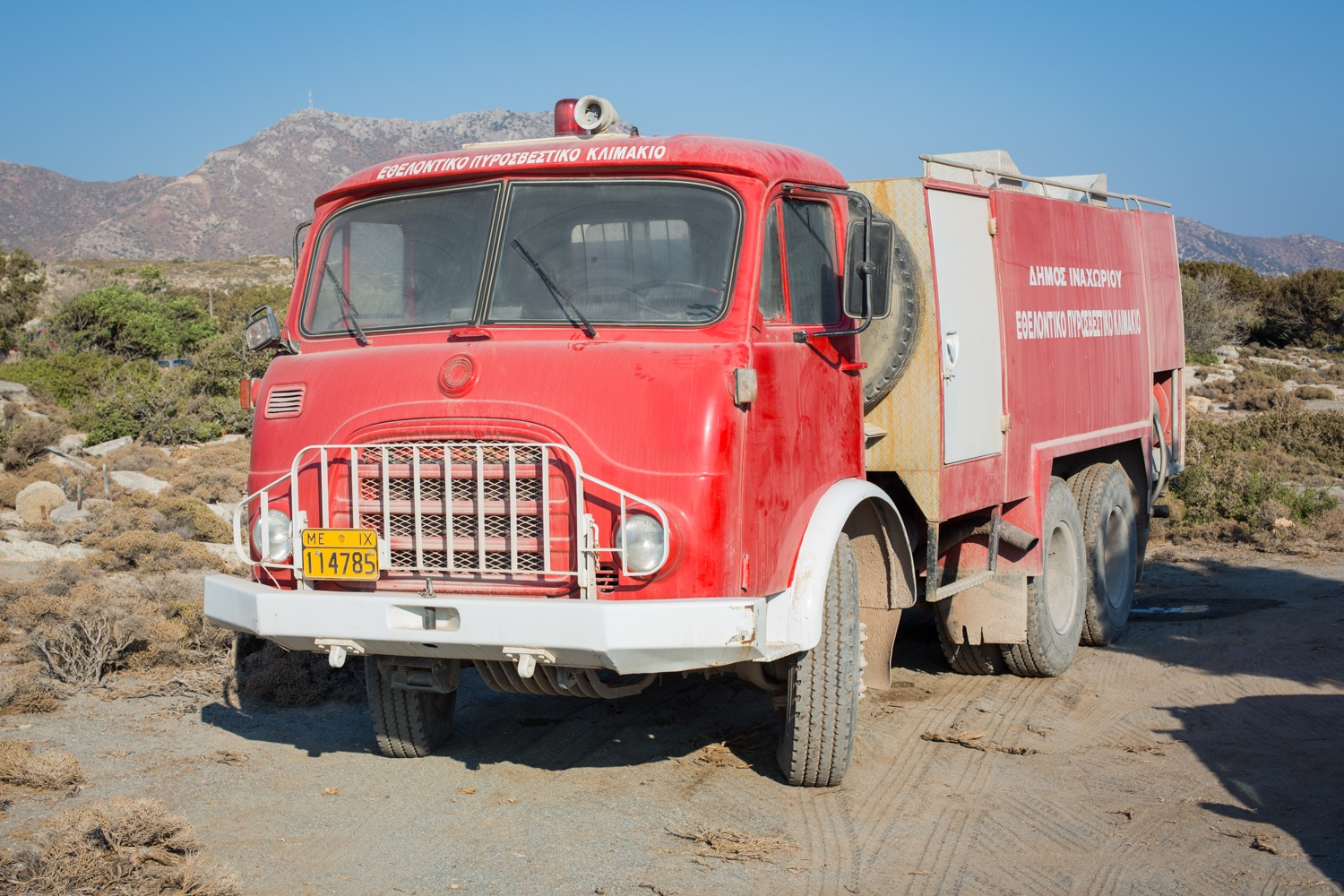
Steyr Hellas 680 fire engine.

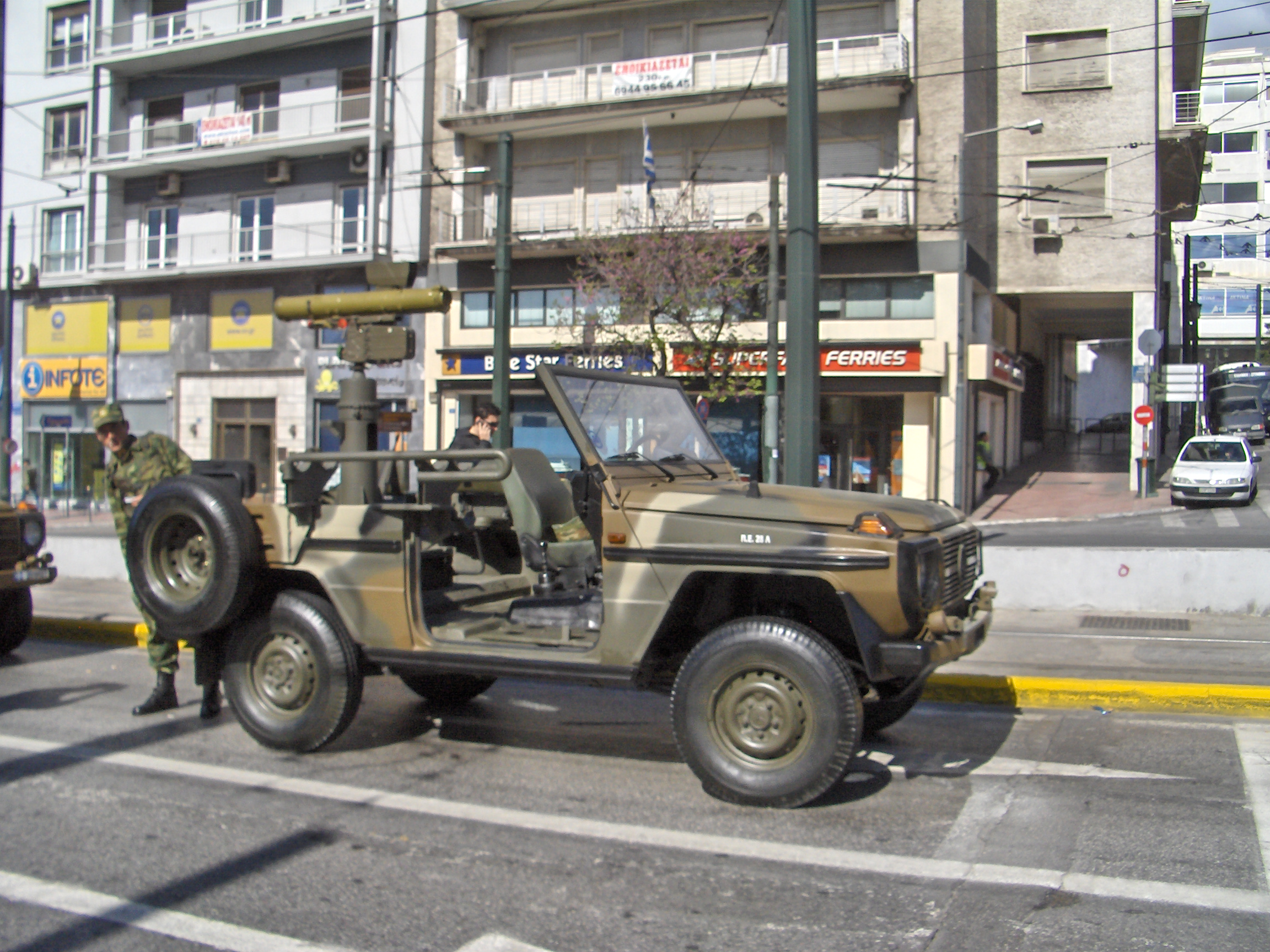
Mercedes-Benz G-Class W462 armored car

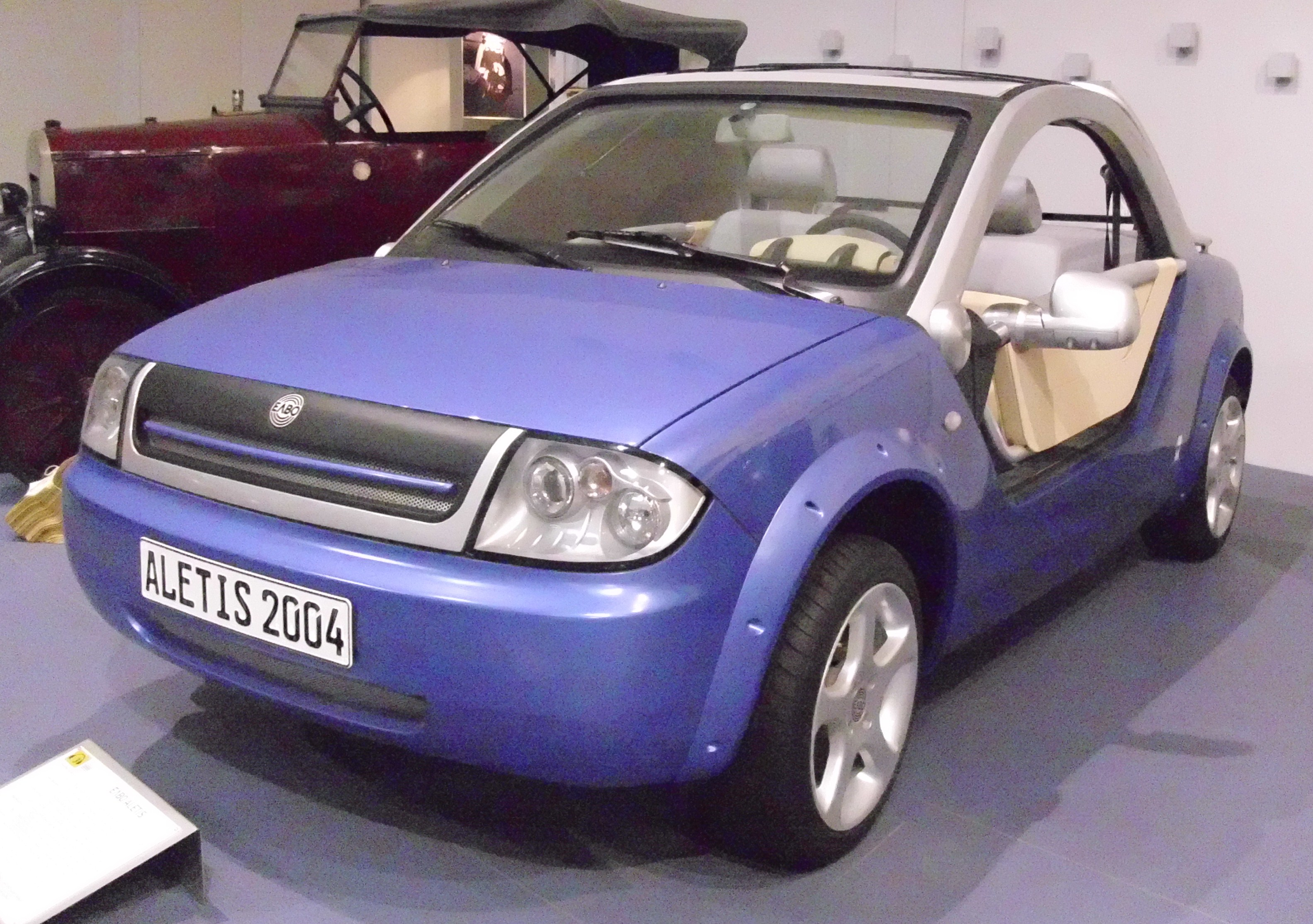
ELVO Aletis concept car

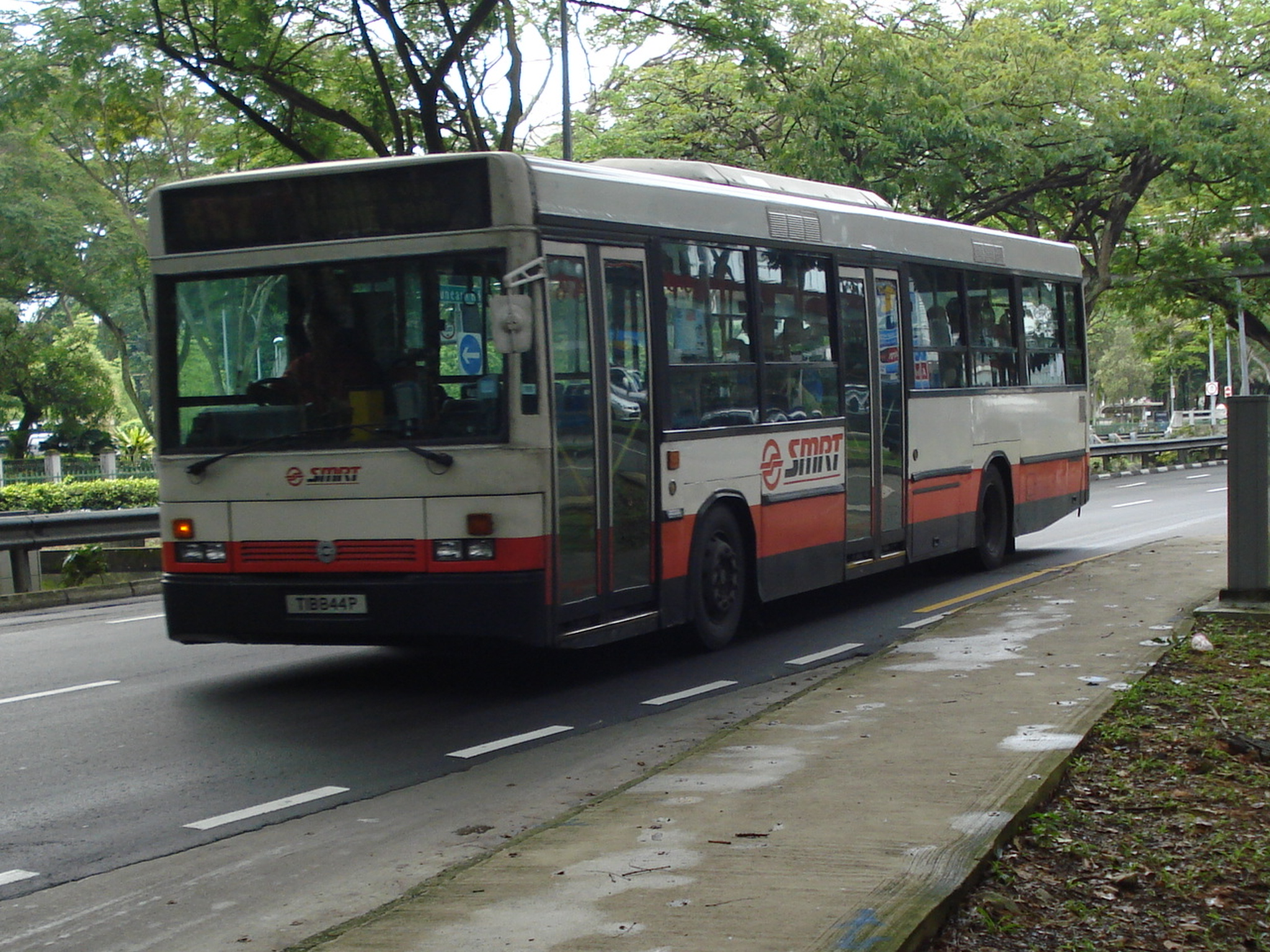
SMRT Buses ELVO-bodied Scania L L113CRL

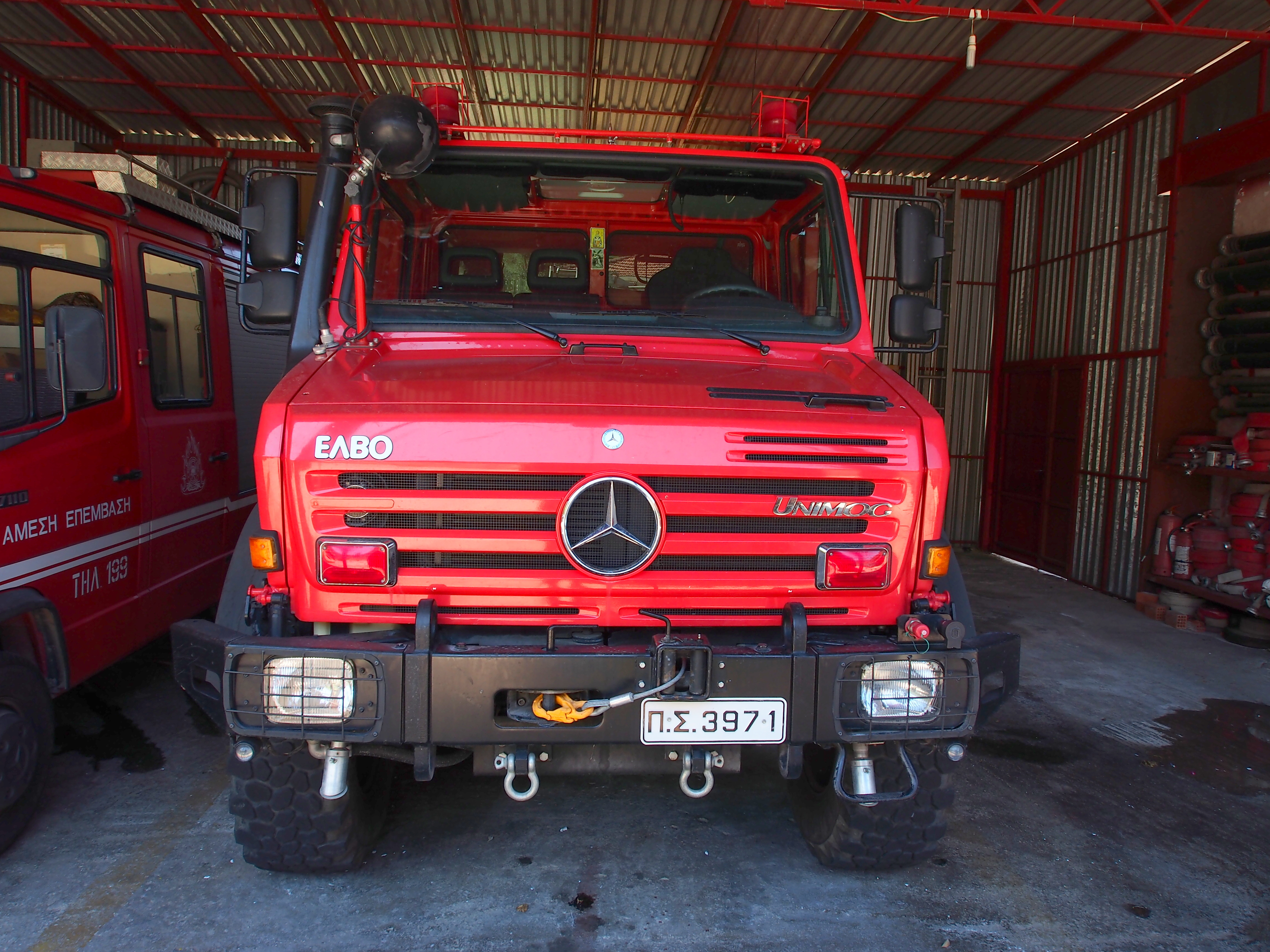
Unimog U4000 fire engine.

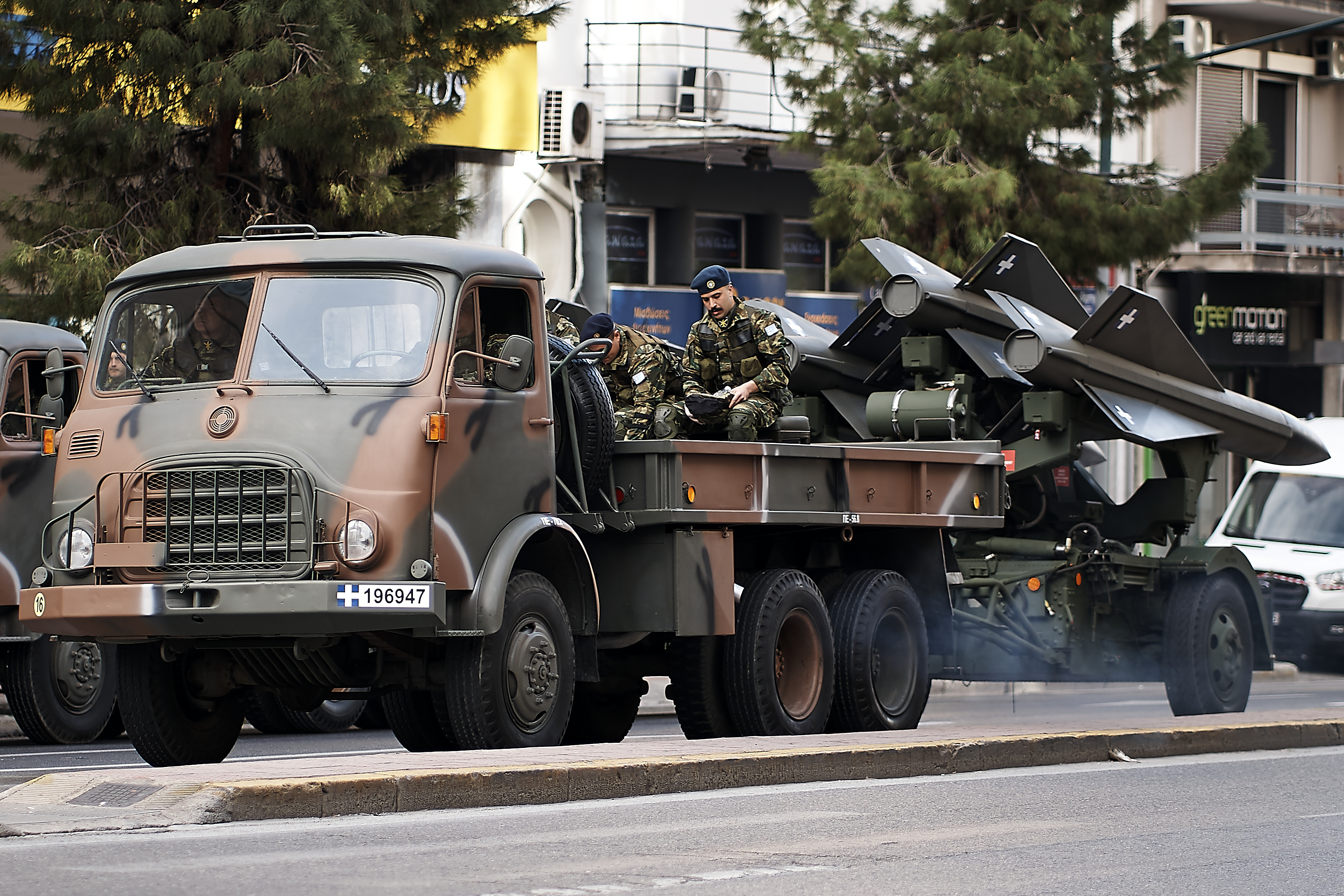
Steyr Hellas 680MH hauling a MIM-23 Hawk in Athens military parade.
