= Garelli =

Garelli is a surname. Notable people with the surname include:

- Adalberto Garelli (1886–1968), Italian engineer and entrepreneur
- Arduino Garelli (1889–1953), Italian military officer
- Carla Garelli, Paraguayan model
- Jacques Garelli (1931–2014), French-language poet and philosopher
- Paul Garelli (1924–2006), French Assyriologist and professor
- Vincenza Garelli della Morea (1859–1920s), Italian pianist and composer

== See also ==
- Garelli Motorcycles, Italian moped and motorcycle manufacturer
