= Garelli Cross =

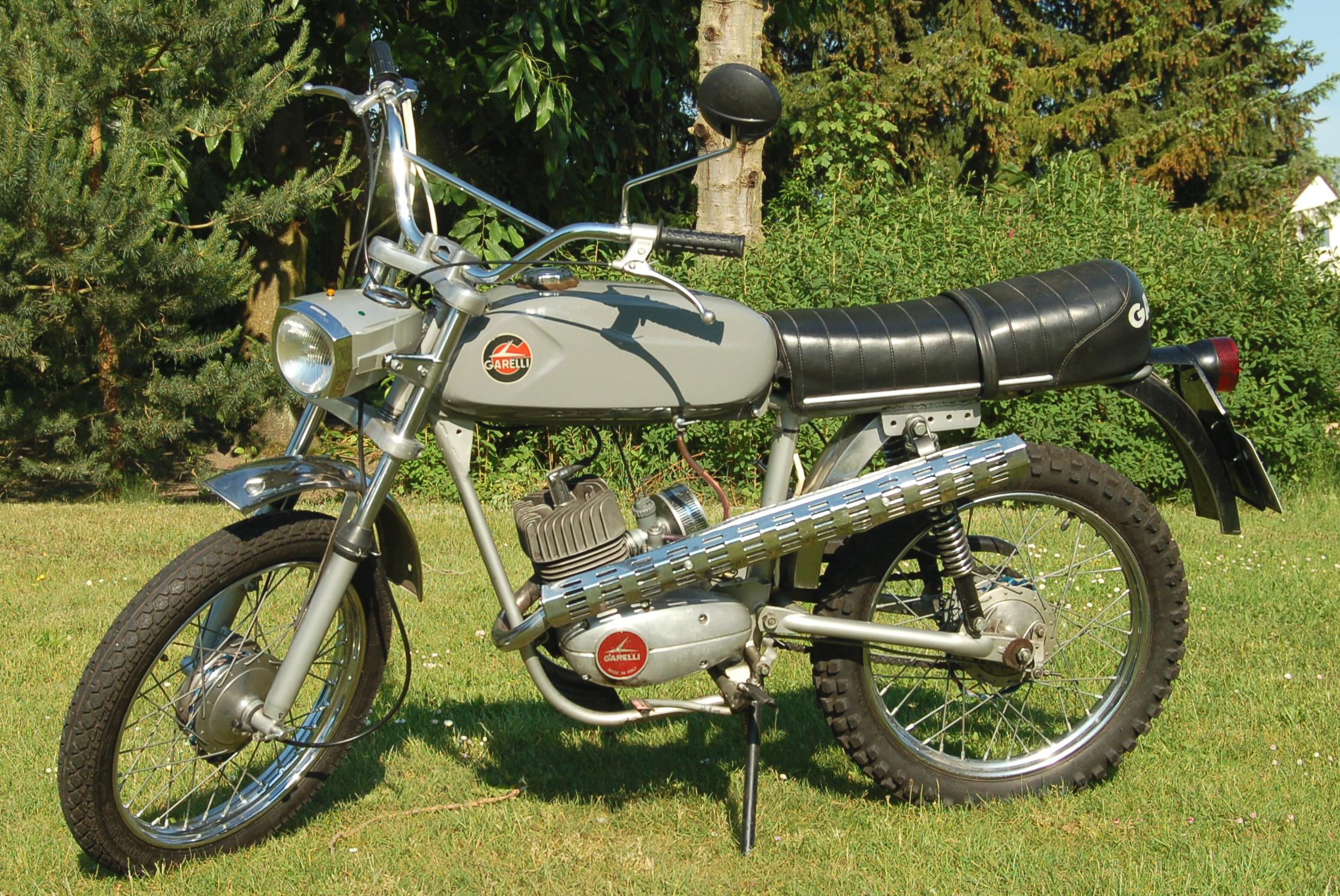
- Garelli Cross, model year 1968
- Manufacturer: Garelli (Meccanica Garelli S.p.A.)
- Production: 1967–1972
- Class: Moped / Lightweight motorcycle
- Engine: Single-cylinder, two-stroke, air-cooled
- Bore / stroke: 40 mm × 39 mm
- Compression ratio: 12:1
- Top speed: approx. 75 km/h (47 mph)
- Power: 5.8–6.2 hp (4.3–4.6 kW)
- Ignition type: Flywheel magneto with external ignition coil
- Transmission: 4-speed foot-shift manual
- Frame type: Tubular steel with engine skid plate
- Suspension: Telescopic fork (front), swingarm with dual adjustable shock absorbers (rear)
- Brakes: Drum brakes front and rear (full hub with dual shoes)
- Tires: 2½ × 17" (front), 2.50 × 17" (rear)
- Wheelbase: 1170 mm
- Seat height: 1010 mm
- Weight: 69 kg (dry)
- Fuel capacity: 10 L
- Fuel consumption: approx. 2 L/100 km

The Garelli Cross is a lightweight motorcycle (moped) built by the Italian manufacturer Garelli Motorcycles between 1967 and 1972. It was designed as a sporty off-road capable machine, combining compact dimensions with rugged mechanical components. The Cross was available in both single-seat and two-seat configurations.

== Design and features ==
The Cross was powered by a single-cylinder, air-cooled two-stroke engine designated as the 354 nBZKW. This engine was a sportier, short-geared variant of the 354 BZKW unit used in other Garelli models such as the Garelli Rekord and Garelli Monza. Depending on the model year, it produced either 5.8 hp at 8150 rpm (early versions) or 6.2 hp at 8500 rpm (later versions).

Thanks to its short transmission ratios and relatively small 17-inch knobby tires, the Garelli Cross had notably strong acceleration compared to other mopeds of its time, though its top speed was limited to around 75 km/h (47 mph).

Key features included a Dell’Orto UB20S carburetor, a kickstarter, and a 4-speed foot-operated gearbox. The bike also had a high-mounted exhaust with a protective heat shield, a motocross-style handlebar, and a tubular steel frame with an integrated engine skid plate. Later models featured adjustable shock absorber mounts at the rear, allowing riders to fine-tune the suspension stiffness—an uncommon feature for mopeds of the era.

The suspension system comprised a telescopic fork up front and a swingarm with dual shock absorbers in the rear. Both front and rear wheels were equipped with drum brakes featuring full hubs and dual brake shoes.

The electrical system operated on 6 volts, using a flywheel magneto with an external ignition coil. The lighting system included a 30-watt headlight and a 5-watt tail light.

== Technical specifications ==
- Engine displacement: 48 cc
- Power output: 5.8 hp (8150 rpm) to 6.2 hp (8500 rpm)
- Transmission: 4-speed manual
- Starting system: Kickstart
- Carburetor: Dell’Orto UB20S
- Gear ratio: Short final drive for off-road use
- Fuel consumption: approx. 2 L/100 km
- Top speed: approx. 75 km/h (47 mph)
- Tires: 2½ × 17" (front), 2.50 × 17" (rear)
- Brakes: Drum brakes with full hubs and dual brake shoes
- Electrical system: 6 V, external ignition coil, flywheel magneto
