= Garzelli =

Garzelli is an Italian surname. Notable people with the surname include:

- Enrico Garzelli (1909–1992), Italian rower
- Stefano Garzelli (born 1973), Italian cyclist

== See also ==
- Garelli (disambiguation)
