= Basil van Rooyen =

South African racing driver (1939–2023)

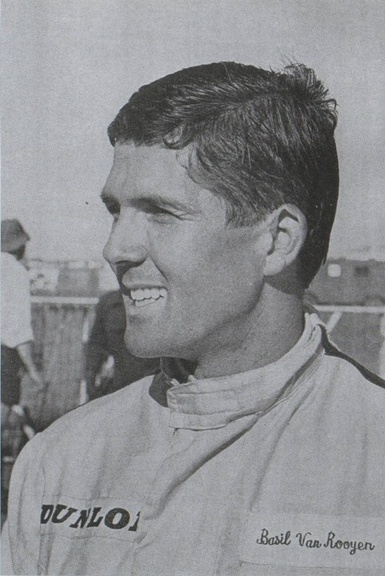
- Van Rooyen after a race in South Africa, 1969
- Born: 19 April 1939; Johannesburg, South Africa
- Died: 14 September 2023 (aged 84); New South Wales, Australia

Formula One World Championship career
- Nationality: (South Africa) South African
- Active years: 1968–1969
- Team(s): non-works Cooper, non-works McLaren
- Entries: 2
- Championships: 0
- Wins: 0
- Podiums: 0
- Career points: 0
- Pole positions: 0
- Fastest laps: 0
- First entry: 1968 South African Grand Prix
- Last entry: 1969 South African Grand Prix

Basil van Rooyen (19 April 1939 – 14 September 2023) was a South African racing driver, race car developer, inventor, and engineer. His career comprised racing a motorcycle, Anglia, Lotus Cortina, Mustang, Alfa Romeo, Capri Perana Chevy Can-am, Fiat/Ferrari saloon cars, sports cars, single seaters and Formula 1.

== Participation ==
Puch 250. Van Rooyen started racing motorcycles in 1957 with the 24 hour race at Grand Central track, a narrow race track near Johannesburg. At the time, he was 18 years old, having just gotten his license.

== Sprint racing ==
Ford Anglia 105E. Home modifications and some imported parts brought many class wins and overall places in 1961 and 1962 on the newly inaugurated Kyalami Racetrack. Upgraded to a Cortina 1200cc in 1963.

In 1964, Ford Motor Company SA donated two Lotus Cortinas to the most successful SA Ford racers. (1 to van Rooyen and Superformance, a performance shop where he was Managing Director, to race in the new countrywide SA Saloon Car Championship and 1 to Willie Meissner, talented ex-GSM Dart engineer, of Meissner Motors and driver Koos Swanepoel, who raced an Anglia 1500). BvR car at first could not keep up and Swanepoel won the 1964 SA Saloon Car Championship.

In 1965, van Rooyen's development skills surpassed Meissner, his nemesis, and he was faster and won all or nearly all the races.

SA Saloon Car Championship racing became so popular with race fans that in 1966 Ford SA donated the new Ford Mustang V8s to the same pair. BvR car was consistently faster and he won all the races to become 1966 and 1967 SA Saloon car champion.

In 1968, Alfa Romeo had imported an Auto Delta Alfa GTA but it was not fast enough, so they persuaded van Rooyen to develop. (He had been racing Alfa GTVs since 1966 in the Onyx Production Car Series, additional events at the Kyalami venue.) Van Rooyen developed a short stroke 2000cc engine which soon lapped faster than his Mustang and started competing very successfully against Meissner’s and Ford SA's new Escorts with 1800cc and 2000cc 4v engines.

Arnold Chatz took over later on when van Rooyen became involved in single seater racing. He had been persuaded to race the older ex John Love Cooper Climax against world champions in the 1968 South African Grand Prix. He enjoyed single seaters debut so much that he imported a newer Brabham to enter in the rest of the SA events for the balance of the 1968 year, then a 1968 MacLaren for the 1969 year. He managed three F1 wins by the time he participated in the 1969 SA Grand Prix. Later in the year, he had serious accident on the Kyalami straight while tire testing that destroyed the car, and needed time to recuperate.

It seemed van Rooyen so impressed the Grand Prix F1 teams with his 1969 Kyalami Grand Prix driving that he was offered a F1 engagement by Ken Tyrrell to immediately join his team as a 2nd driver behind team leader Jackie Stewart. Due to his injuries from the Kyalami crash this was no longer possible.

In 1970, van Rooyen continued racing in Onyx Production Car Series and won the Onyx Production Car Championship in an Alfa GTV.

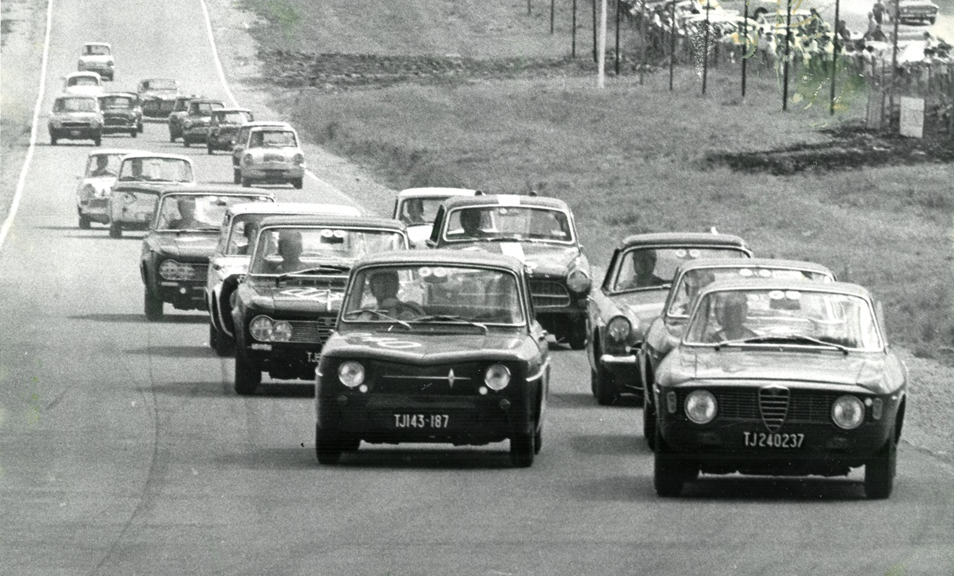
BvR leads the Onyx Production Car Race, 1966

During 1971, Paddy Driver offered van Rooyen his older F5000 single seater to try out, to see if he still had the racer's heart, and van Rooyen finished 3rd and 1st in F5000 behind two F1 cars, satisfying himself.

New regulations were introduced in 1971 for the Transvaal Production Car Championship. The car to beat was the Ford Capri Perana V8 (a special SA vehicle made by Basil Green Motors). Van Rooyen purchased one of these and was soon able to beat the factory car regularly.

This special edition SA car gave van Rooyen an idea! He made a proposal to General Motors to market a vehicle similar to the Basil Green Ford Capri V8. Developed their Vauxhall Firenza, using a 302 cid Camaro V8 engine and running gear. 100 vehicles would have to be built by GM (SA), which van Rooyen convinced them to do, and were sold locally to make this car, dubbed Chev Can-am, race eligible.

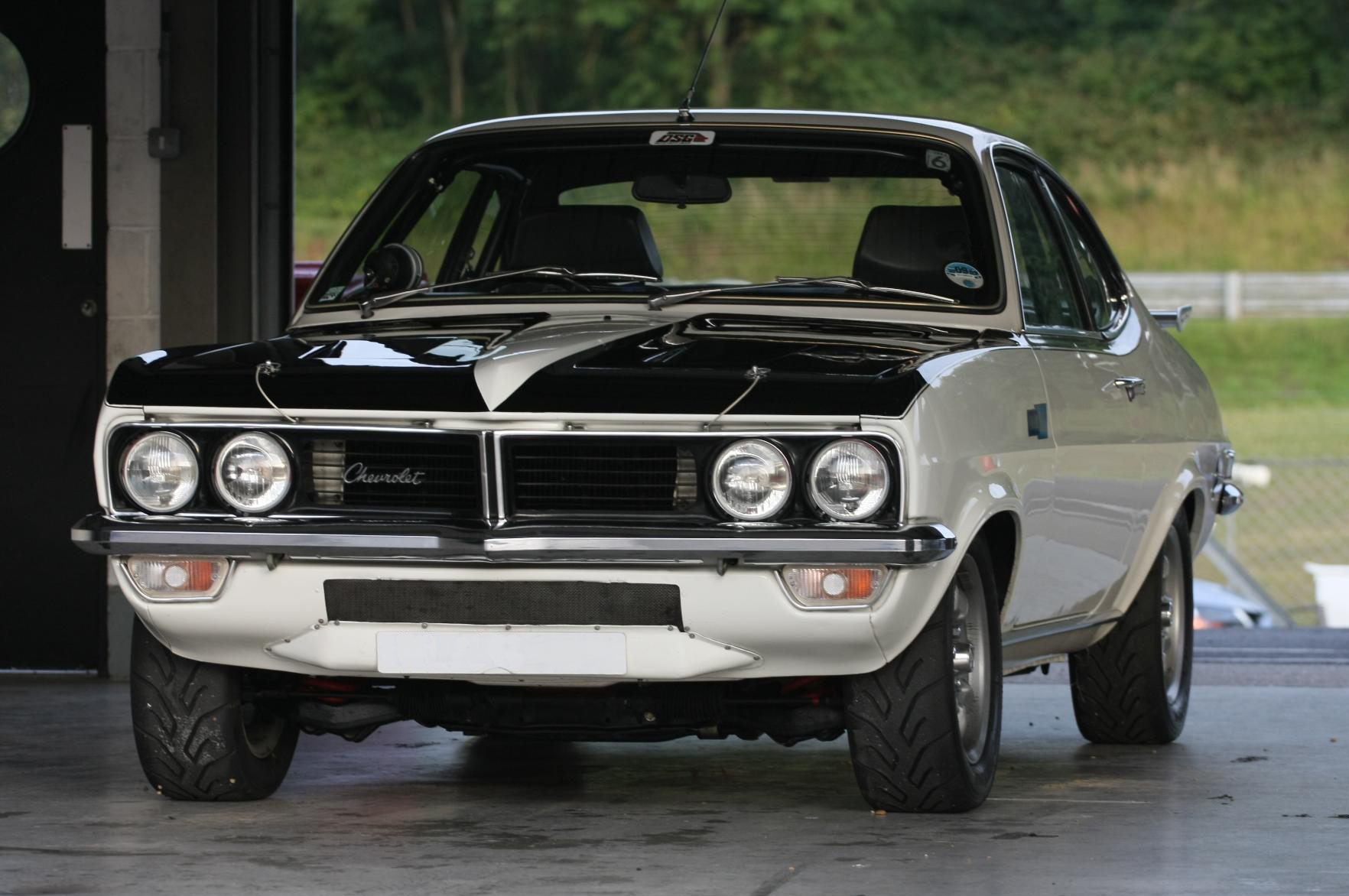
South African Produced Chev Can-am V8

Two of the race vehicles developed into highly successful racing saloons. They set the first saloon car 100 mph lap record, won their debut race, and went on to secure easy victories as many competitors were deterred from taking part. These Can-Am cars remain popular with collectors today.

1977 took him to Australia to compete at the well known Sandown 500 and Bathurst 1000 events, in a local GM Holden V8 Torana against the Ford V8s. He made 4th place in the Sandown with a dated model A9X. The SL5000 he was sharing with British Saloon Car Champion Gerry Marshall at Bathurst retired with a broken seat.

In 1979, race organizers introduced a new racing formula, allowing any engine/chassis from one make to be combined. Fiat SA was interested. This required fabricating a space frame vehicle with fibre-glass panels to look like a Fiat 131, mated with a turbo charged 2.5 litre Ferrari v6 600 bhp power unit. This car quickly proved one of the fastest saloon cars in the type of racing, but shortly after the debut Fiat decided, pressured by sanctions against SA, to pull out of the country. The car was sold off, but still raced by other drivers. The formula was short-lived.

== Endurance racing ==
As well as the abovementioned sprint races, van Rooyen participated in the Annual Kyalami 9 hour endurance races and the Springbok 3 hour series enduros nearly every year, sharing drives with local drivers Arnold Chatz, Eddie Keizan, Dave Charlton, Chappie Wicks, George Santana, Brian Davies, Geoff Mortimer, Colin Burford, Antonio Prixinho, Peter Gough, and overseas owner/drivers Nanni Galli, Christine Becker, Tony Dean. Best result was a 2nd place with Tony Dean driving a Ferrari Dino in the 1968 Kyalami 9 hour.

Mazda SA brought their competition Mazda RX100 Saloon from Japan with factory support team to the 1971 Springbok Endurance Series, van Rooyen and Gough as drivers. Engine performance was impressive, but van Rooyen was so disappointed with the handling that he phoned the SA factory boss for an OK to make alterations. So, just 2 days before the race, the front suspension was removed, parts and brackets cut, welded, bent etc., then re-assembled - to the horror of the Japanese mechanics! (Thereafter it lapped - the text says! - up to 4 seconds faster??)

== Inventor ==
- Automatic swimming pool cleaners always skipped certain areas during their cleaning cycle. Invented the Twister, to be added to the suction line, which was patented and so successful that royalties still come in.
- After witnessing serious F1 accidents caused by throttles jamming wide open, invented a special device to be fitted to the brake hydraulics, cutting power to the ignition when a great excess of brake pressure was applied.
- Well ahead of his time, before it even occurred to the top world F1 teams, he invented and fabricated a successful automatically spring activated rear wing drag reduction setup, which was affixed to the high wing of his F1 vehicle, reducing the angle of attack. The high wing configuration was banned by the FIA soon after, due to wing mount breakage accidents.
- Developing the CITS two stroke power unit, presently still being perfected. One of the most promising new internal combustion ideas, offering reduced fuel consumption, eliminating mixing oil with fuel, meeting global smog emissions regulations, improved torque and power at all rpms, better power per unit weight, over other two-stroke and 4 stroke units.

== Participation in F1 Grand Prix racing ==
Van Rooyen participated in two Formula One World Championship Grands Prix, debuting on 1 January 1968. He retired from both, scoring no championship points.

== Personal life and death ==
In later life, Van Rooyen was diagnosed with mesothelioma, caused by asbestos. He died in New South Wales, Australia on 14 September 2023, at the age of 84.

== Racing record ==
=== Complete Formula One World Championship results ===
(key)

Year	Entrant	Chassis	Engine	1	2	3	4	5	6	7	8	9	10	11	12	WDC	Points
1968	John Love	Cooper T79	Climax Straight-4	RSA; Ret	ESP	MON	BEL	NED	FRA	GBR	GER	ITA	CAN	USA	MEX	NC	0
1969	Team Lawson	McLaren M7A	Ford V8	RSA; Ret	ESP	MON	NED	FRA	GBR	GER	ITA	CAN	USA	MEX		NC	0

=== Complete British Saloon Car Championship results ===
(key) (Races in bold indicate pole position; races in italics indicate fastest lap.)

Year	Team	Car	Class	1	2	3	4	5	6	7	8	Pos.	Pts	Class
1966	Superformance Racing Team	Ford Mustang	D	SNE	GOO	SIL	CRY	BRH	BRH; Ret	OUL ?†	BRH	40th	2	10th

† Events with 2 races staged for the different classes.

=== Complete Bathurst 1000 results ===
Year	Team	Co-driver	Car	Class	Laps	Pos.	Class pos.
1977	(Australia) Bill Patterson Racing	(United Kingdom) Gerry Marshall	Holden LX Torana SS A9X Hatchback	3001cc - 6000cc	107	DNF	DNF

== Sources ==
- Photos of van Rooyen and various racing cars
- Profile at www.grandprix.com
- Book publication: Kyalami a reflection on the history pp 396-400 ISBN 978-0-620-48826-6
- Springbok Series by Greg Mills ISBN 978-1919969435 Book on An Era of Sports and Saloon Car Racing in Southern Africa
- compendium of articles by SA Journalists
- The CITS - Crankcase Independent Two-Stroke Engine
