= Puch 250 SGS =

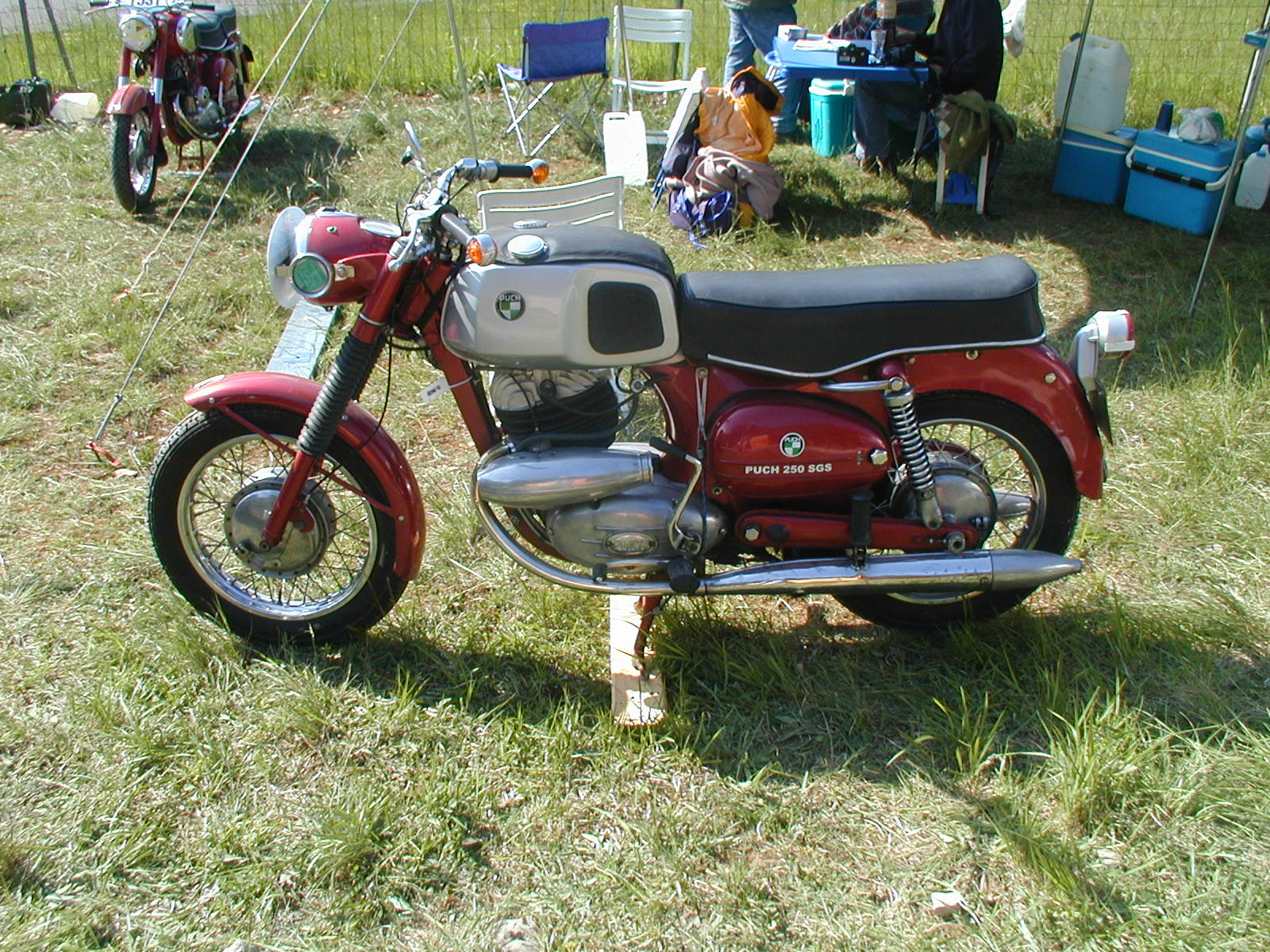
- Manufacturer: Steyr-Daimler-Puch
- Also called: Sears SR 250
- Production: 1953–1969
- Class: Sport bike
- Engine: 248 cm^{3} (15.1 in^{3}) split single
- Bore / stroke: 2 x 45 millimetres (2 x 1.8 in); 78 millimetres (3.1 in)
- Top speed: 110 kilometres per hour (68 mph)
- Power: 16.5 horsepower (12.3 kW) @ 5800 rpm
- Torque: 16.8 pound force-feet (2.32 kgf⋅m) @ 3300 rpm
- Transmission: 4-speed, chain drive kick starter
- Weight: 155 kilograms (342 lb) (dry)
- Fuel capacity: 13 litres (3.4 US gal)
- Fuel consumption: 30.3 kilometres per litre (71 mpg_{‑US})

The Puch 250 SGS (Schwing-Gabel-Sport) is a motorcycle that was manufactured by the Austrian Steyr Daimler Puch AG's Puch division in Thondorf near Graz. The motorcycle is powered by a split-single two-stroke engine (two pistons sharing a single combustion chamber). It was marketed in the United States by Sears as the "Allstate 250" or "Twingle", with the model number SR 250, and sold primarily via the Sears catalog. It was a common "first motorcycle" for many riders.

A total of 38,584 Puch 250 SGS motorcycles were produced between its launch on October 1, 1953, and end of production in 1969, with its final year of sale in 1970.

== See also ==
- Puch
- Split-single
- List of motorcycles by type of engine
- Sears Dreadnought (1910s m. bike)
- List of motorcycles of the 1950s
