= Split-single engine =

Type of two-stroke internal combustion engine

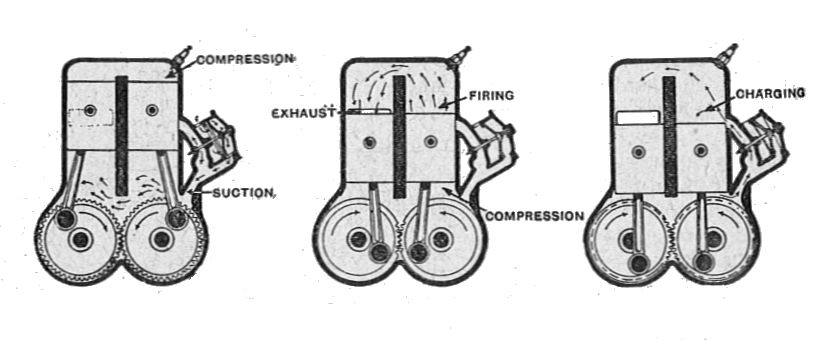
Split-single engine used by the DBS Valveless car from 1908 to 1915. The first picture shows the moment of firing.

The split-single engine (British English; twingle engine in U.S. English) is a type of two-stroke internal combustion engine where two cylinders share a single combustion chamber.

The first production split-single engine was built in 1908, and various designs were used on several motorcycles and cars until the mid-1950s, with Puch continuing with their version until 1970. During this time, the design was occasionally used for engines with four or more cylinders.

== Operating princple ==
Operating principle, with exhaust port left and intake right

The split-single uses a two-stroke cycle (i.e. where every downward stroke produces power) with the following phases:

1. Pistons travel upwards, compressing the fuel-air mixture in both cylinders. A spark plug ignites the mixture (in the right side cylinder in the animation) when the pistons are near the top of the cylinders.
2. Pressure from the ignited air-fuel mixture pushes both pistons downwards. Near the bottom of the travel, an exhaust port becomes exposed (at the rear of the left side cylinder in the animation), causing the exhaust gases to exit both cylinders. (This video (referenced below) explains and demonstrates some of the other types of split single, as well as the one in the animation.) At the same time, the intake port is exposed on the other cylinder, causing a fresh air-fuel mixture (which has been compressed in the crankcase by the downward movement of the pistons) to be drawn into the cylinder for the next cycle.

== Characteristics ==
The advantage of the split-single engine compared to a conventional two-stroke engine is that the split-single can give better exhaust scavenging while minimizing the loss of fresh fuel/air charge through the exhaust port. As a consequence, a split-single engine can deliver better economy, and may run better at small throttle openings. A disadvantage of the split-single is that, for only a marginal improvement over a single-cylinder engine, a split-single engine is larger, heavier and more expensive. Since a manufacturer could produce a conventional two-cylinder engine at similar cost to a split-single engine, a two-cylinder engine is usually a more space- and cost-effective design. Most split-single engines used a single combustion chamber (spanning both cylinders), with larger engines (such as with four-cylinders) continuing to share one combustion chamber per cylinder pair.

Initial designs of split-single engines from 1905 to 1939 used a single Y-shaped or V-shaped connecting rod. Externally, these engines appeared very similar to a conventional single-cylinder two-stroke engine, with one exhaust, one carburetor in the usual place behind the cylinders, and one spark plug. The Puch GS 350 of 1938 and the Triumph BD 250 of 1939 used a conventional single rod per piston.

After World War II, more sophisticated internal mechanisms improved mechanical reliability and led to the carburetor being placed in front of the barrel, tucked under and to the side of the exhaust. An example of this arrangement was used on the 1953-1969 Puch 250 SGS.

Early engines using a "side-by-side" layout (with the carburetor in the "normal" place behind the cylinder) had similar lubrication and pollution problems to conventional two-stroke engines of the era, however the revised designs after World War II addressed these problems.

== Pre-World War II examples ==
=== Lucas ===
The first split-single engine was the Lucas, built in the UK in 1905. It used 2 separate crankshafts connected by gears to drive 2 separate pistons, so that the engine had perfect primary balance.

=== Garelli ===
From 1911 to 1914, Italian engineer Adalberto Garelli patented a split single engine which used a single connecting rod and long wrist pin which passed through both pistons. Garelli Motorcycles was formed after World War I and produced a 350 cc (21 cu in) split-single motorcycle engine for road use and racing from 1918 to 1926.

=== Trojan ===
The Trojan two-stroke, as used from 1913 in the Trojan car in the UK, was independently invented but would now be described as a split-single. This video of a working cutaway model of a Trojan engine shows the internals. Unlike the German/Austrian motorcycle engines, this engine was water-cooled. The tax horsepower regulations in the United Kingdom resulted in a lower road tax for the Trojan compared with a conventional engine of similar displacement.

Trojan also made another split-single engine later with the cylinders arranged in a 'V' formation. The unusual 'V6' design had two split-single sets of cylinders (4 cylinders total) on one bank of the V and two scavenge blower cylinders on the other bank of the V.

=== Puch ===
After World War I ended, Austrian industry struggled to recover. Italian engineer Giovanni Marcellino arrived at the main factory of Puch with the instruction to wind up operations. Instead of liquidating the factory, he settled in the town and designed and began production of a new split-single engine which debuted in the 1923 Puch LM racing motorcycle. Influenced by industrial opposed-piston engines, the Puch engine had asymmetric port timing and pistons arranged one behind the other (instead of the side-to-side arrangement used by Garelli). To avoid flexing of the connecting rod, the small-end bearing of the cooler intake piston was arranged to slide slightly fore-and-aft in the piston. In 1931 Puch won the German Grand Prix with a supercharged split-single. By 1935, a four-cylinder version of the Puch split-cylinder design produced 10 kW (14 hp) and was used in motorcycles. Since 1938 Puch produced the GS 350 model, each piston has its own connection rod.

=== Triumph-Werke Nürnberg ===
1939-1943 the model BD 250 with asymmetric port timing was produced. Each piston had its own connection rod.

=== Motor racing ===
From 1931 until 1939, DKW racing motorcycles powered by split-single engines dominated the Lightweight and Junior racing classes.

At the 1931 and 1932 Indianapolis 500, Leon Duray competed with cars powered by the 16-cylinder Duray U16 engine using a split-cylinder design.

In 1935, the Monaco-Trossi Grand Prix car was built with a 16-cylinder radial engine using a split-cylinder design.

== Post-World War II Examples ==
=== Puch ===
Puch's split-single production and racing were restarted in 1949, and a split-single engine was used in the Puch 125T model.

The 1953-1969 Puch 250 SGS (sold in the United States by Sears as the "Allstate 250" or "Twingle") used with an improved system of one connecting rod hinged on the back of the other. These engines typically use the forward piston to control both intake and exhaust ports, with the interesting result that the carburettor is at the front of the engine, under and to the side of the exhaust. The rear piston controls the transfer port from the crankcase to the cylinder. Increasingly, these models were fitted with an oil mixing pump, fed from a reservoir incorporated in the petrol tank. Some also have a twin-spark plug ignition system firing an almost figure-eight shaped combustion chamber. The improvements tamed, if not virtually eliminated, the previous problem of two-stroke plug fouling. A total of 38,584 Puch 250 SGS motorcycles were produced between 1953 and 1970.

Puch ceased production of split-single engines around 1970.

=== EMC Motorcycles ===
EMC Motorcycles in the United Kingdom manufactured a 350 cc (21 cu in) split-single engine that was used in the 1947-1952 EMC 350. After 1948 the engine also was fitted with an oil pump controlled by the throttle, which dispensed two-stroke oil into the fuel at a variable rate depending on throttle opening, instead of having to pre-mix oil in the fuel.

=== Iso Autoveicoli ===
The Italian manufacturer began producing a 236 cc (14 cu in) split-single engine in 1952 for their Iso Moto motorcycle. This engine was then used in the Iso Isetta bubble car from 1953 to 1956.

The cylinders were arranged fore-and-aft, with a Y-shaped conrod. This necessitated the rear piston being attached to the conrod via a rectangular small end. Scroll to the bottom of the page in the link, for an illustration.

=== Triumph-Werke Nürnberg ===
Triumph-Werke Nürnberg (TWN) in Germany continued production of a split-single engines for their motorcycles in 1946, but not with asymmetric port timing as the pre-war BD 250. The 125 cc (8 cu in) TWN BDG 125 and 250 cc (15 cu in) TWN BDG 250 models, produced from 1946 to 1957, used a Y-shaped connecting rod, so the pistons are "side-by-side", making the engine little different visually from a regular two-stroke. Other split-single models from TWN were the 1954-1957 TWN Cornet (200 cc with 12 volt electrics and optionally electric starter), the 1953-1957 TWN Boss (350 cc) with 2 carburetors and the 1954-1957 Contessa scooter (200 cc). The bulbous shape of the exhaust of the Cornet and Boss is an anti-noise two-stroke TWN feature. All TWN motorcycle production ceased in 1957.

In 1953 TWN showed the model Duplex at a fair. This 250 cm^{3} engine was a 2-cylinder split-single with 4 pistons. This motorcycle was not produced.

== Potential supercharger development ==
Arnold Zoller's supercharged "Doppelkolben" engine

Phase shift between pistons also allows use of a supercharger, which may be effective for two-stroke diesel engines.

== See also ==
- Opposed-piston engine
- List of motorcycles by type of engine
- Scuderi engine
