= Puch Maxi =

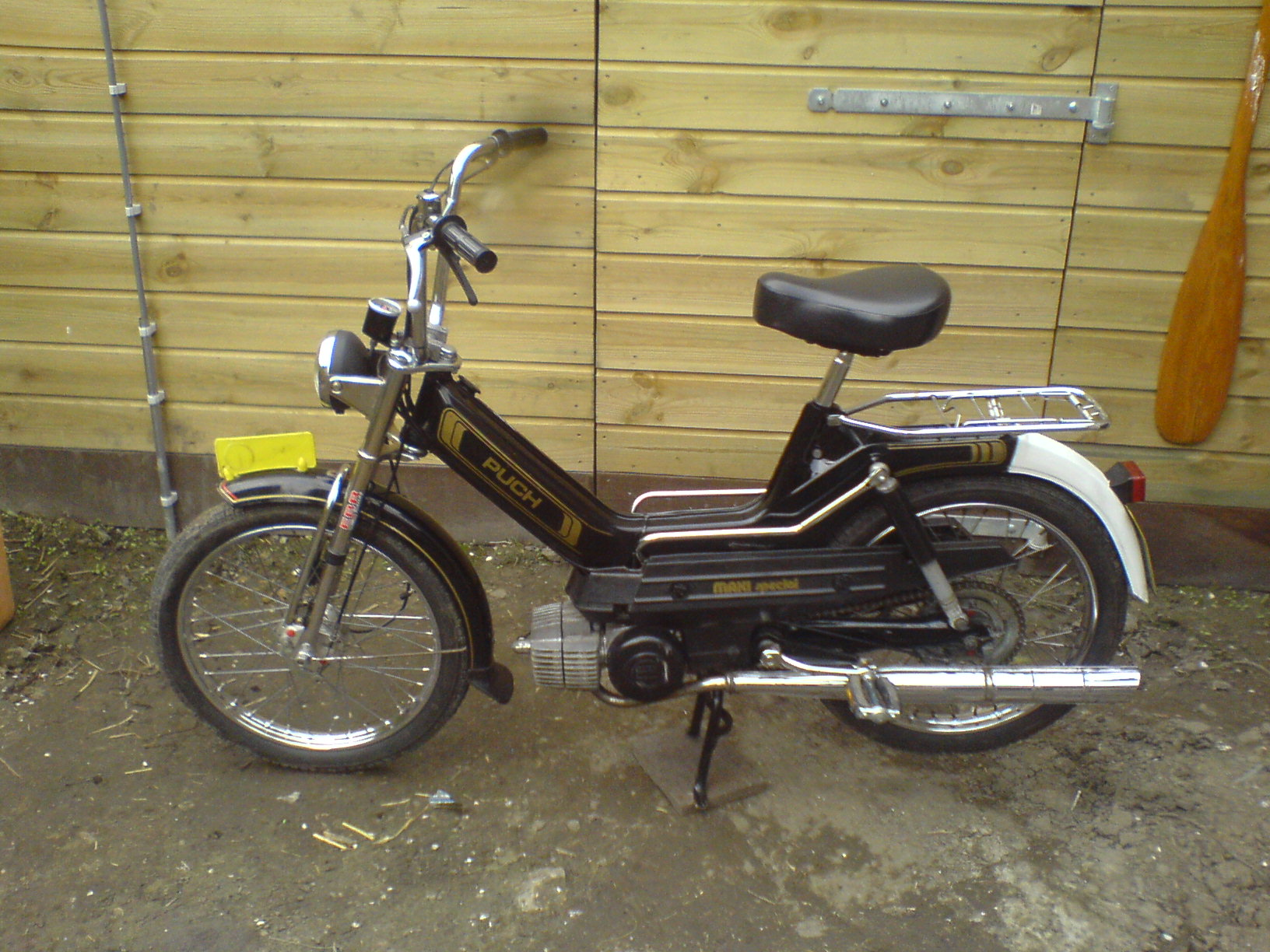
- Manufacturer: Puch
- Production: 1969–1990 (at Puch), 1991–1995 (at Piaggio)
- Class: Moped
- Engine: 48.8 cc air-cooled two stroke
- Power: 0.8 kW (1.2 PS) at 4000 RPM
- Transmission: single speed automatic E50, two speed automatic ZA50 or two speed hand-shifted Z50 transmission
- Fuel capacity: 0.845 US gallons (3.2 L) (http://projectmopedmanual.info/manuals/puch/puch-maxi-owners-manual.pdf)

The Puch Maxi is a moped that was manufactured by the Austrian manufacturing company Puch through the 1970s and 1980s that is well known for its reliability, ease of maintenance, and fuel economy (up to 120 mpg). These mopeds gained wide acceptance during the 1973 oil crisis and are still widely available for aftermarkets, and mint examples are still valued by collectors today. It is started using a pedal start mechanism where the user provides the force needed to start the 48cc two stroke engine, or can be ridden like a bicycle when the engine is disengaged. The later models feature a kick start mechanism.

== Models ==
The Puch Maxi comes in several models:

- Maxi S: this is the full suspension model with the single speed E50 (one speed) engine/transmission.
- Maxi D or LS: same as the S, but with a longer seat for a passenger.
- Maxi Luxe: A Maxi with a stock Hi-Torque head and mudflaps.
- Maxi N: A rigid frame lacking a speedometer that was the cheapest model, and dubbed the "Poor man's maxi".
- Maxi Sport MKII: Has a full suspension, mag wheels, the ZA50 (two speed) engine/transmission, a longer seat (but not long enough for passengers like the maxi D or LS model).
- Maxi Nostalgia: was only available in 1976. It is a black/gold Maxi with decals styled after Puch's turn-of-the-century motorcycle logo. Its predecessor is the Newport.
- Newport: Same as a Maxi S, but has different decals and hand pinstriping and sometimes a brown saddle, and comes with reflective whitewalls.
- Newport L: An updated Newport with swoop decals instead of pinstriping, a black transmission and flywheel cover, and a puffy saddle.
- Newport Auto-start/Oil Inject: A newport that features metallic paint, oil injection, and lacks a clutch lever.
- Newport II: Newport that features the ZA50 (two speed) engine/transmission.
- Maxi Guam Edition: a few Maxis that showed up in the United States that claimed to be manufactured in Guam. These have Honda-style controls where the switches integrate into the lever/throttle housings and come stock with turn signals and sidecovers that enclose a battery. Guam built Maxis are claimed to be built better than the USA models.
- Maxi BMX Special: Produced as a limited run in 1976 to celebrate the success of the company's BMX bicycles, production lasted only three months due to poor public reception. It featured the single speed E50 engine/transmission.

== Engine ==
The Puch Maxi uses a 2 stroke 48cc two stroke gasoline engine of 38mm bore 42mm stroke that comes in three horsepower ratings: 1.0, 1.5, and 2 HP that limits the speed to 20 mph (32kmh), 25 mph (40 kmh) and 30 mph (48 kmh) respectively. However, these can be modified by de-restricting the airbox, carburetor, exhaust manifold, pipe, and the use of aftermarket and performance parts.

== Transmission ==
The engine is coupled to either a single speed E50 or a two speed ZA50 transmission. The versions of the transmissions can be identified by the shape of the gearboxes: The E50 has a round gearbox whereas the two speed has a rectangular gearbox. Both transmissions use a centrifugal clutch, the E50 has one, while the ZA50 has two. (one for each gear)
