= Puch =

Austrian vehicle manufacturing company

Puch AG & Co KG
- Type: Public
- Industry: Vehicle
- Founded: 1889
- Headquarters: Graz, Styria, Austria
- Key people: Johann Puch, Founder
- Products: Automobiles, bicycles, motorcycles, mopeds
- Revenue: part of Magna Steyr
- Number of employees: ~1,100 (1912)
- Parent: Cycleurope
- Website: Puch-bikes.com

Puch (German pronunciation: [pʊχ]) is a manufacturing company located in Graz, Styria, Austria. The company was founded in 1889 by the industrialist Johann Puch and produced automobiles, bicycles, mopeds, and motorcycles. It was a subsidiary of the large Steyr-Daimler-Puch conglomerate.

== History ==
=== Foundation ===
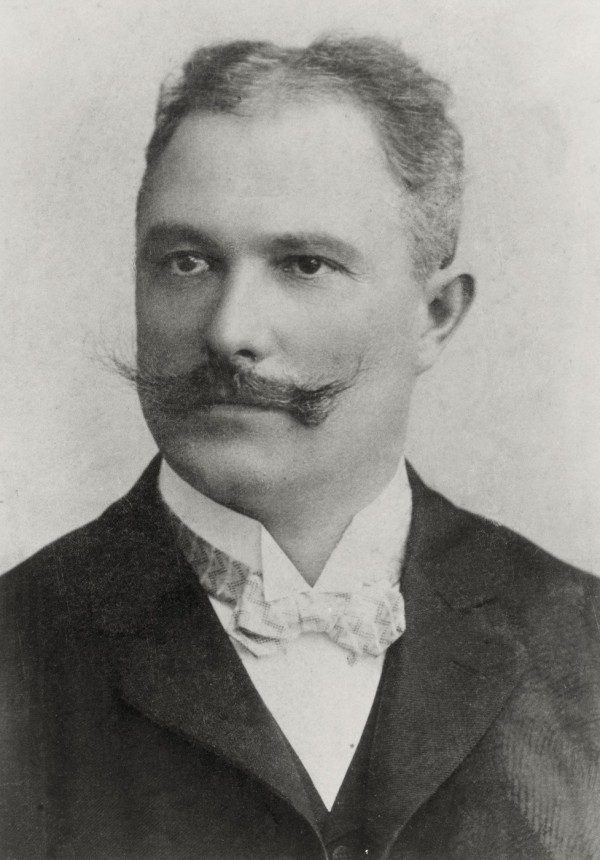
Johann Puch in the 1890s

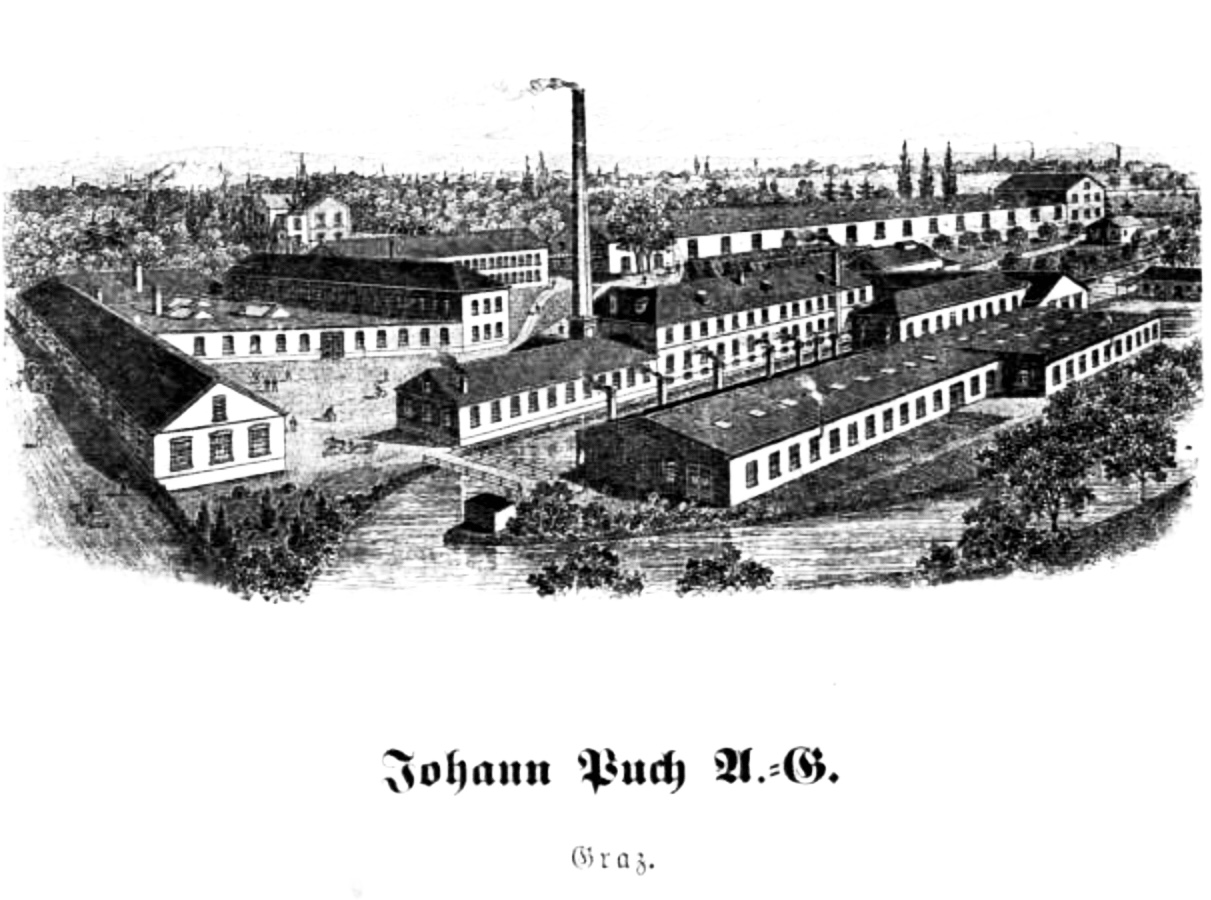
Johann Puch AG (1912)

From 1889, Johann Puch (1862–1914) worked as an agent for Humber vehicles and manufacturer of Styria safety bicycles in a small workshop in Graz and in 1890 he founded his first company, Johann Puch & Comp., employing 34 workers. Cyclists like Josef Fischer, winning the first edition of Paris–Roubaix in 1896, popularized Styria bicycles which were even exported to England and France. By 1895, Puch already employed more than 300 workers producing about 6000 bikes a year.

In 1897, Puch left the company after a dispute with his business partners. Two years later he founded the First Styrian Bicycle Factory AG (Erste Steiermärkische Fahrradfabrik AG) in Graz. Puch's company became successful through innovation and quality handicraft, rapidly expanding over time. It soon began producing motorcycles and mopeds.

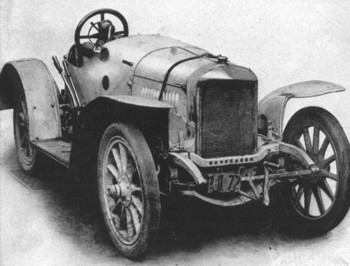
1907 Puch 8/9 PS

The main production plant, later called Einser-Werk, was constructed in the south of Graz, in the district of Puntigam. Production of engines was started in 1901 and cars followed in 1904. In 1906 the production of the two-cylinder Puch Voiturette began and in 1909 a Puch car broke the world high-speed record with 130.4 km/h. In 1910, Puch is known to have produced sedans for members of the Habsburg imperial family.

In 1912, Johann Puch went into retirement and became the company's honorary president. In that year the company employed about 1,100 workers and produced 16,000 bicycles and over 300 motorcycles and cars annually. Puch automobiles were successful at the pre-war Österreichische Alpenfahrt rally and from 1913, the four-cylinder 38 PS (horsepower) Type VIII Alpenwagen was manufactured in Graz. During World War I, Puch became an important vehicle supplier to the Austro-Hungarian Army.

The Puch green and white chequered badge is in the colours of the Steyr town flag and is very similar in concept to the BMW badge, which is in the colours of the Bavarian flag.

=== Between wars ===
With the collapse of the Austro-Hungarian empire following the War, the market for automobiles shrank and production was discontinued. However, again in 1919, the new Type XII Alpenwagen was developed.

In 1923, the Italian engineer and FIAT agent Giovanni Marcellino is said to have been sent by the banks to wind up the Puch factory in Graz. Instead of which, within a few weeks he had settled down to live in the town, designing and then producing a new version of the split-single. Taking his inspiration from industrial counter-piston engines, the new engine benefited from the improved breathing of the Italian original, to which he added asymmetric port timing. In 1931 Puch won the German Grand Prix with a supercharged split-single, though in subsequent years the split-singles of DKW did better.

In 1928, the company merged with Austro-Daimler into the new Austro-Daimler-Puchwerke. This company in its turn merged in 1934 with Steyr-Werke AG to form the Steyr-Daimler-Puch conglomerate.

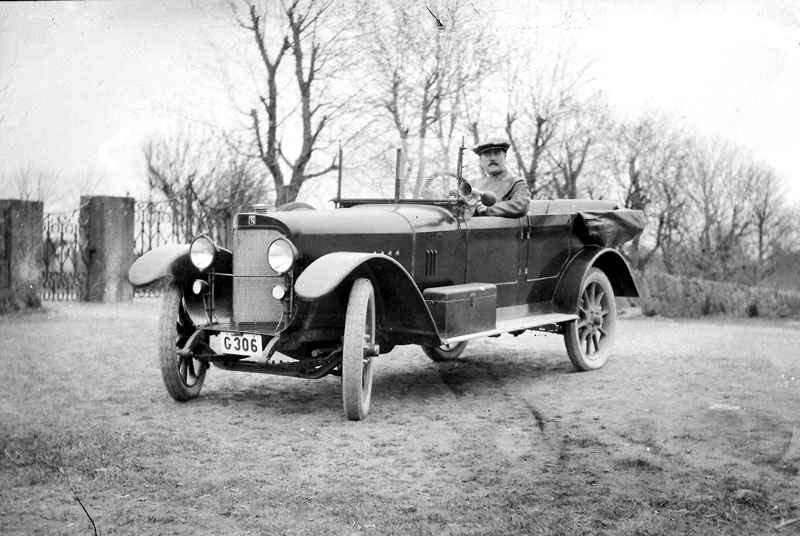
Puch XII Alpenwagen in Sweden, 1924/25

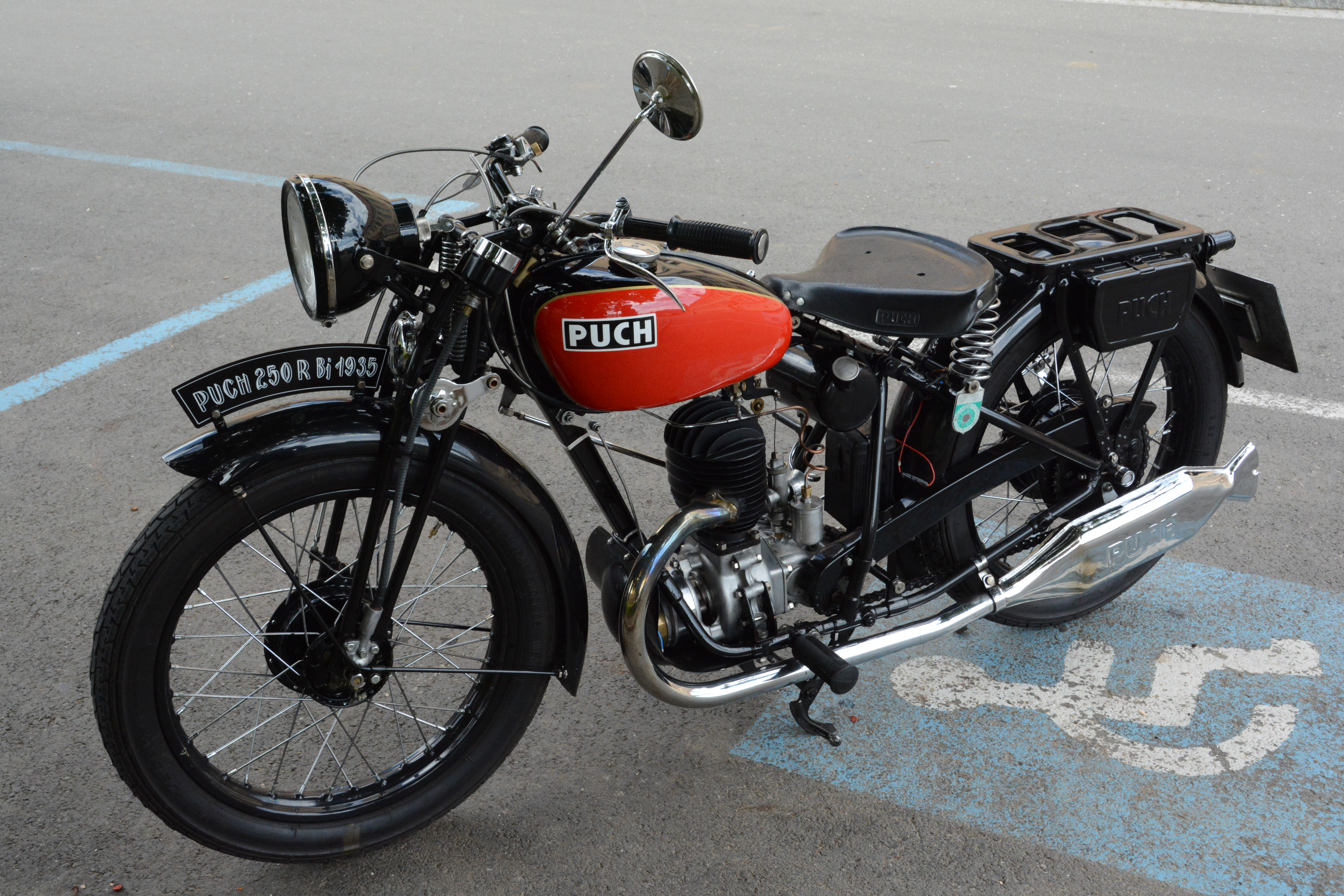
Puch 250 R, built 1935

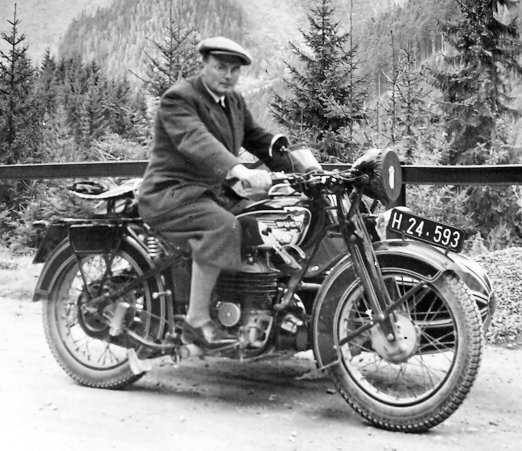
Motorcycle Puch 500 VL with sidecar Felber, built 1937

=== WWII ===
Like all enterprises of its kind, the Puch production plants had to change to arms production during World War II. The existing capacity was insufficient, therefore a second plant was constructed and opened in 1941 in Thondorf, Graz. In the three original assembly halls, luxury vehicles for the American market were produced. Steyr-Daimler-Puch is one of the companies known to have benefited from slave labor housed in the Mauthausen-Gusen concentration camp system during World War II. Slaves from the camp were used in a highly profitable system used by 45 engineering and war-effort companies, and amongst them Puch had an underground factory built at Gusen in 1943.

=== Post-War years ===
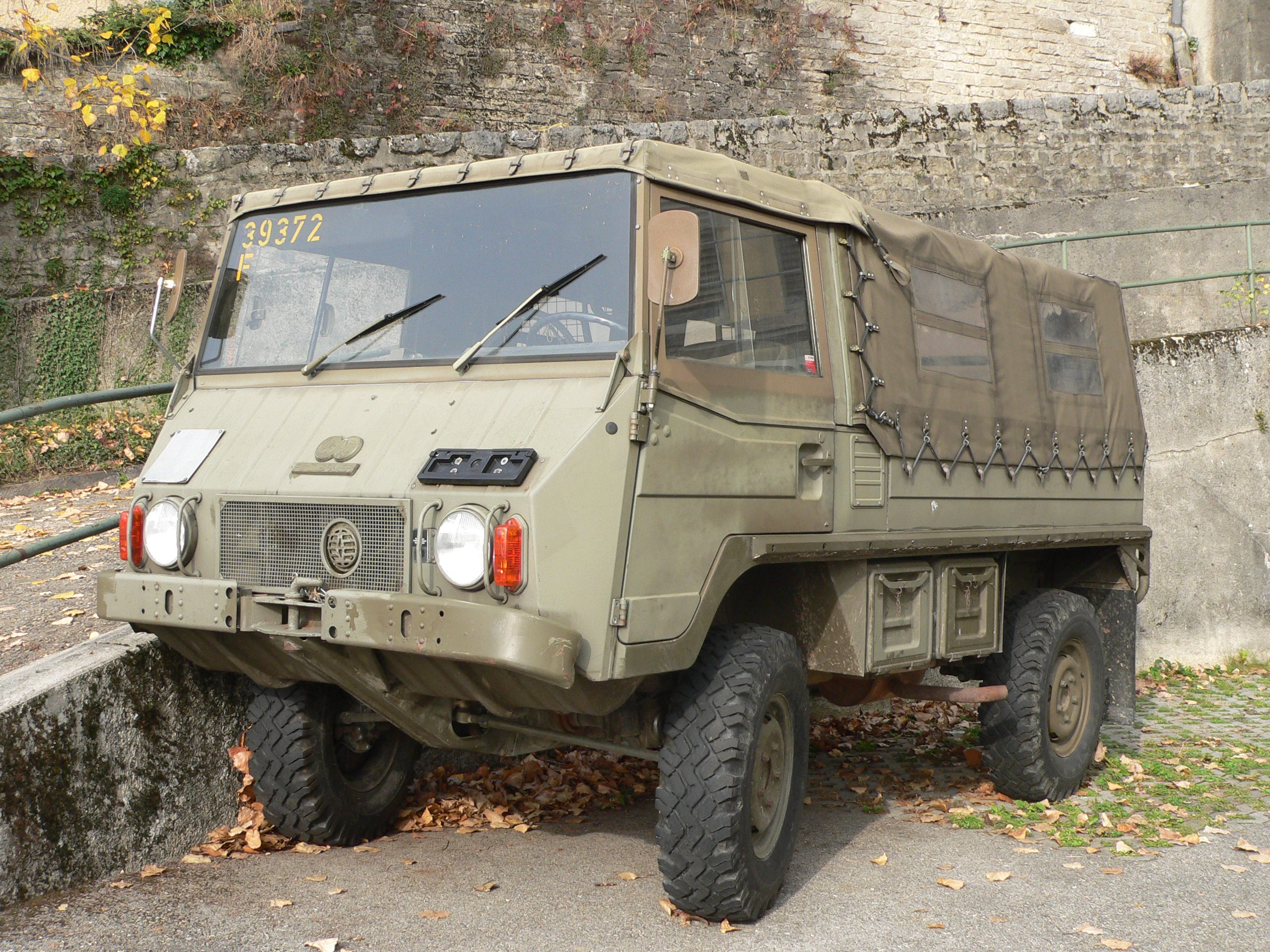
Steyr-Puch Pinzgauer High Mobility All-Terrain Vehicle, 1970-1999

During the period immediately after the war, late 1945 to 1947, the factory was requisitioned and run by the British Army (R.E.M.E.) who used the facilities and what remained of the workforce for the repairing and servicing of British and American military vehicles. In 1949, an assembly cooperation agreement was signed with Fiat in Turin. The 1950s to the mid-1970s saw a sharp increase in production of motorcycles, bicycles and mopeds. Even though Puch was a part of Steyr-Daimler-Puch, it still manufactured products under its own name, as well as for Steyr-Puch and other companies. Puch gave up racing in the 1950s and split-single production ended around 1970.

- 1953: Puch launched two new motorcycles, the 125 and 175 SV.
- 1954: The very successful MS 50 moped was launched.
- 1957: The Puch 500 small car came on the market.
- 1958: Production of the Steyr-Puch Haflingers started. 16,657 vehicles are produced in total and exported into 110 countries.
- 1966: Sobiesław Zasada wins the European Rally Championship with a 650 TR II.
- 1969: The most successful Puch product is launched, Puch Maxi moped, 1.8 million of which are built.
- 1970: The cross-country Steyr-Puch vehicle Pinzgauer was launched - production continued until 1999 with over 24,000 built.
- 1973: Production of the Fiat 126 with a Puch engine commenced.
- 1975: Harry Everts wins the 1975 250 cc motocross world championship for Puch.
- 1978: Record-setting year, seeing the production of over 270,000 mopeds and motorcycles as well as 350,000 bicycles.
- 1979: A joint-venture with Mercedes-Benz saw Puch building the Mercedes-Benz G-Class in Graz.
- 1981: Puch has Speed Unlimited of Wayne, NJ manufacture a BMX line called the Puch Trak Pro.
- 1983: A joint-venture with Volkswagen saw the Volkswagen Type 2 (T3)'s engine being built in Graz.
- 1983: A joint-venture with Fiat, where Puch designed and built the four-wheel drive mechanics for the Fiat Panda 4x4 Mk1.

== Vehicles ==
=== Puch scooters ===
The late 1950s saw strong sales of the Puch 125cc two-stroke single motorscooters, which had three gears shifted from the left twistgrip. These machines developed a reputation for reliability and were popular for daily commuting, providing good weather protection and ease of use. In this role their moderate performance, with a top speed of around 45 mph, was not a problem. Later models had a 150cc engine and foot-operation, giving better performance of 6 hp instead of 5 hp but retaining the three gears.

=== Puch mopeds ===
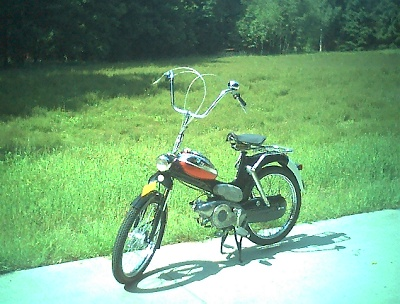
Puch MS50 Moped

Puch produced the Puch Maxi, Puch Newport, and MK mopeds, which were popular from the late 1970s to early 1980s. In Austria and the Netherlands, Puch mopeds played a big role in the 1960s popular culture. Puch mopeds in Sweden were, and still are, very popular despite the company ceasing production of mopeds in 1985. Many of them were named after US states, notable exceptions include the Maxi and the Monza.

Some of the more popular models were:

- VS50 50 cc 2-speed gearbox
- The Dakota (VZ 50) 50 cc fan-cooled, 3-speed gearbox. In fact, the most popular by far.
- The Florida (MV 50) 50 cc fan-cooled, 3-speed gearbox
- The Alabama (DS 50) 50 cc fan-cooled, 3- or 4-speed gearbox

The oldest mopeds often had a 50 cc fan-cooled engine with a 1- or 2-speeded gearbox (cric-crac) and newer mopeds had many different (always 50cc) engines such as:

- Fan-cooled, 3-speed (Dakota, Dakota 3000, Nevada)
- Fan-cooled, 4-speed (Mexico)
- Air-cooled, 3-speed (Arizona, Monza M50, Montana, Monza 3C)
- Air-cooled, 4-speed (Monza 4-speed)

=== Puch BMX ===
Puch began making BMX bikes as early as the 1970s. Many different models appeared including the Challenger, Invader and Trak Pro. A short-lived BMX style moped, the Maxi BMX Special was produced in the mid-70s however proved unpopular. Compared to the company's more successful models very few unmolested examples remain. In 1981 they worked with Speed Unlimited in Wayne, New Jersey to manufacture a line of high end BMX race bikes. Speed Unlimited also made bikes for Hutch and their own brand Thruster. The model they made for Puch was the Trak Pro. In 1981 Puch also began sponsoring BMX racers across the United States. The green, black and white uniform was soon showing up at BMX tracks across America, especially in the Northeast. There is a collection of Puchs at the BMX Museum - Puch Collection.

=== Puch Maxi ===
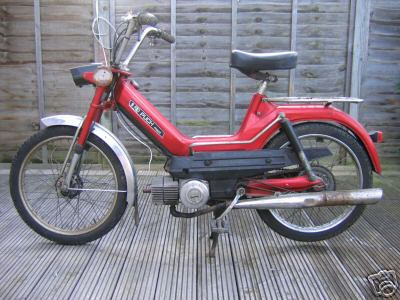
Puch Maxi S Moped

The Maxi is one of Puch's most well known machines along with the Magnum and Newport models. The Puch Maxi is a moped fitted with a single cylinder, 50cc, two stroke engine . This engine was also used in a variety of other mopeds sold in the U.S. by Sears and JC Penny.

The engine produced around 2 hp and could propel the rider at speeds of 28 mph (48 km/h).

It was started using the pedals which could be engaged and disengaged from the engine via a starting lever so it could be ridden as a normal bicycle.

Later models did not have pedals, and instead were started with a kick start mechanism.

=== Puch motorcycle marketed as the "Twingle" ===
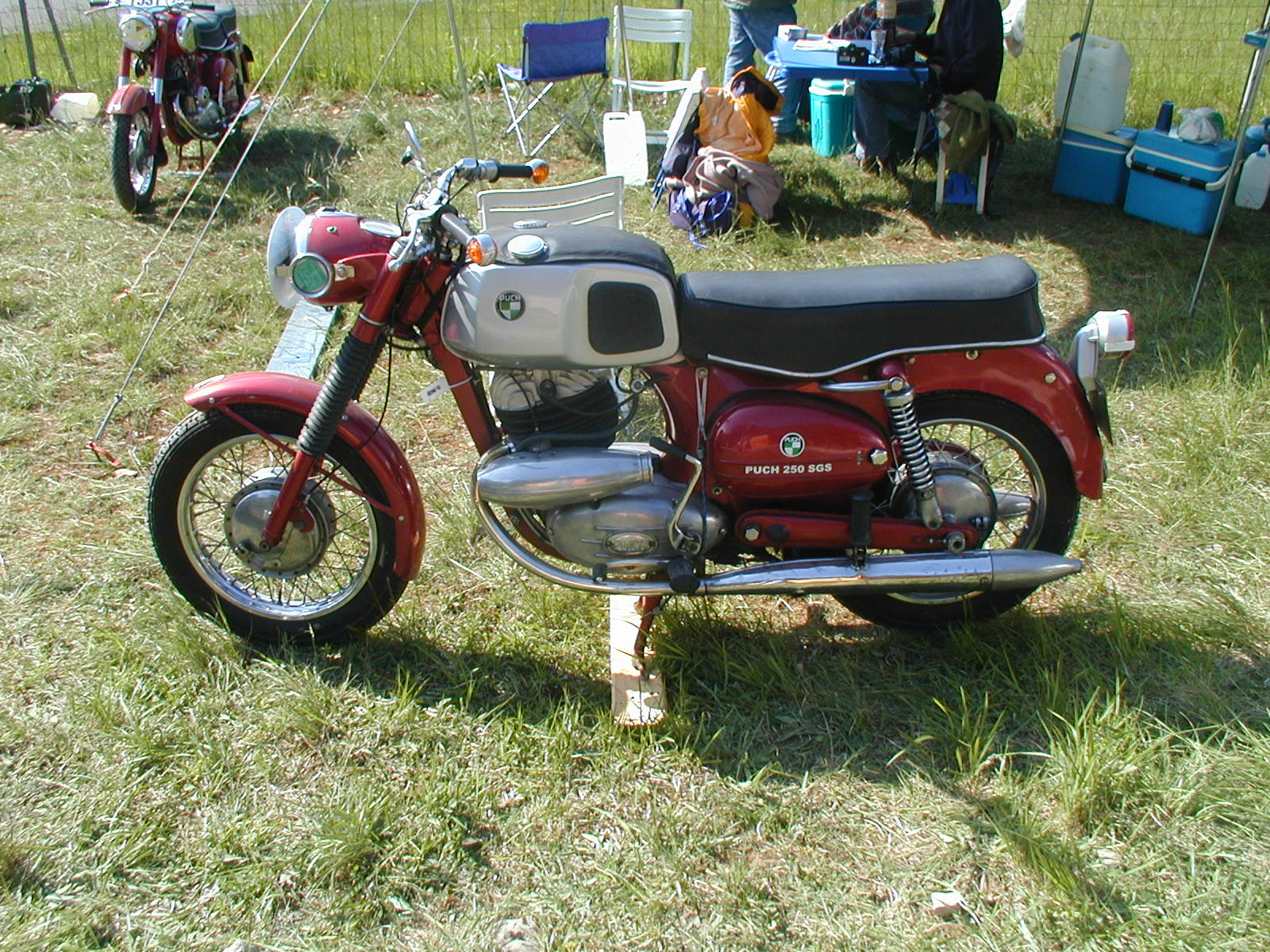
Puch motorcycle 250 SGS

Puch is remembered in the US for importing the SGS 250, the first and last split-single seen there. Marketed by Sears in their catalogue as the "Twingle", it was styled much like a BMW of the 1950s and 60s. The layout had been popular in Europe between the wars because it improved scavenging, and hence fuel consumption, a feature considered less important in the US. New models after World War II had an internal re-arrangement which improved piston lubrication, reducing wear on the most vulnerable part of the engine, while an early system of pumping the two-stroke oil, along with the twin spark-plug ignition, greatly improved day-to-day reliability. Despite the racing heritage and performance potential of the split-single engine, this particular Puch model, with a top speed around 110 km/h (68 mph), was at a disadvantage against the loop-scavenged two-strokes that arrived in the late 1960s. A total of 38,584 of Puch 250 SGS motorcycles were produced between 1953 and 1970.

=== Puch 500 ===
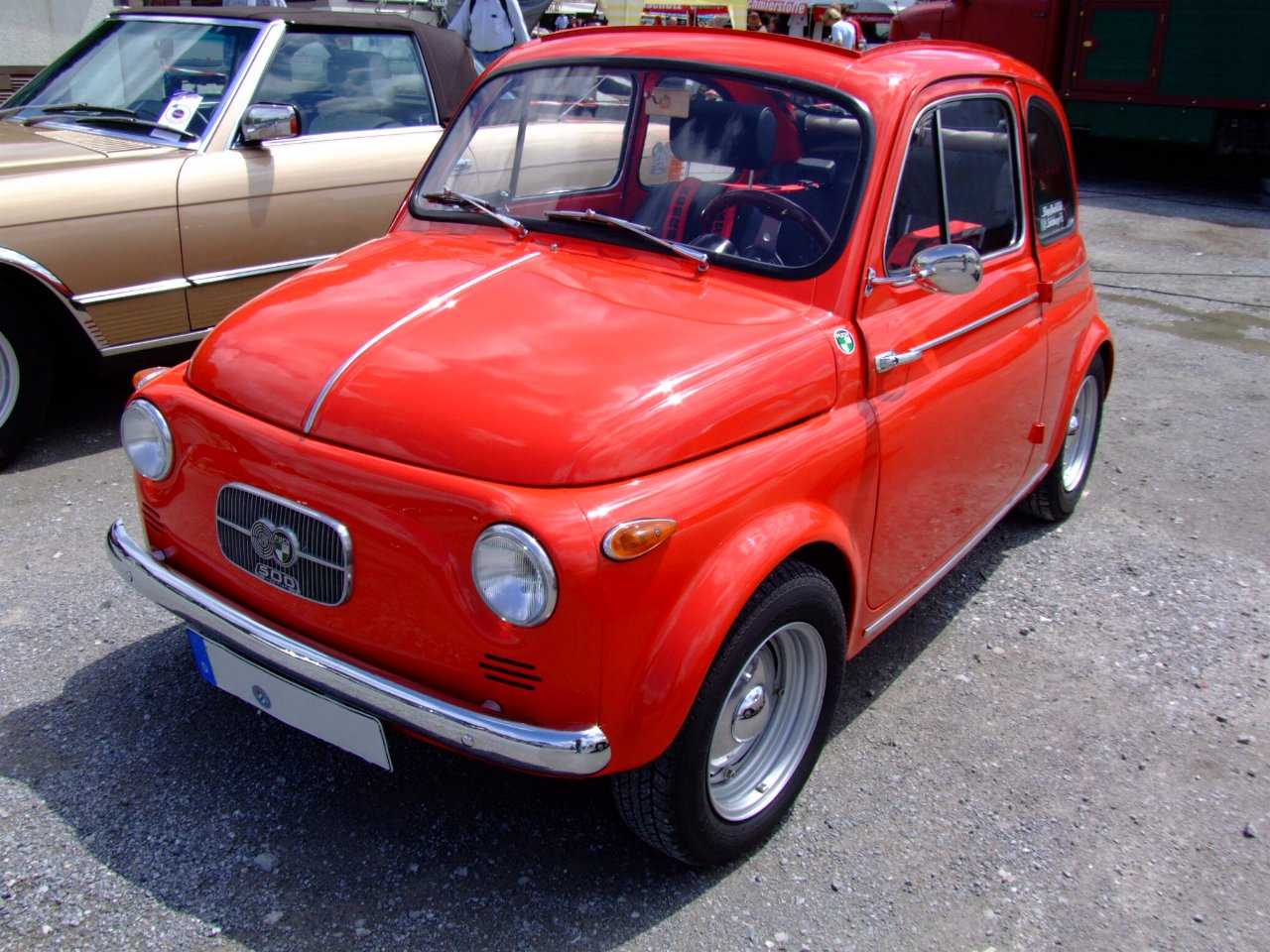
Steyr-Puch 500

The Puch 500 was a city car produced by Steyr-Daimler-Puch in Graz under license from Fiat. Based on the Fiat 500, it was manufactured from 1957 until 1975.

== Foreign ventures ==
In 1970, Puch bought a 50% share of Spanish motorcycle and scooter manufacturer Avello located in the city of Gijón in Asturias, in northern Spain. During the following years that plant manufactured models with Puch motors and original frames and later built Puch models. Over the years, in spite of good sales, the Spanish venture was losing money and in 1983 Suzuki bought 36% from the Spanish owners so the Spanish venture became a Puch-Suzuki venture. In 1988 Suzuki bought all outstanding shares and became sole owner of the Spanish manufacturer.

== Legacy ==
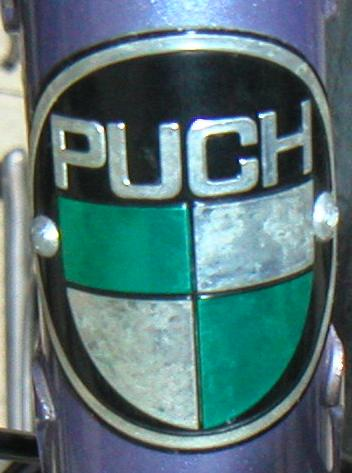
A Puch bicycle head badge.

In the late 1980s, the company was being squeezed out by competition. In 1987, a massive restructuring of the company led to the end of the production of two-wheelers in Graz. The company's technical know-how was always better than its marketing and commercial success. The Puch motorcycle company was sold to Piaggio, maker of the Vespa, in 1987 and still produces bikes under the name Puch. When the bicycle division of Piaggio, which also included Bianchi Bicycles was sold to the Swedish Grimaldi Industri group in 1997, Puch became part of Cycleurope. In 2011, Austrian entrepreneur Josef Faber took control of the brand, with the 2012 line of bicycles manufactured by Cycleurope in France.

Steyr-Puch, assembler of four wheel drive vehicles and parts, still exists next to the Piaggio division.

The so-called "Einserwerk", the first production plant, shut down in the early 2000s. The historical assembly-hall was declared a protected industrial monument. When Graz became European Capital of Culture in 2003, a Puch museum was opened in one of the former assembly halls.

Puch sold the entire production line of Puch Maxi Plus to Hero Motors when production ended in Austria. It spawned the Hero Puch that sold extremely well in India from 1988 until the end of 2003 when production ended.

== See also ==
- Maicoletta
- Zündapp Bella
