= Jacques Garelli =

Serbian philosopher (1931–2014)

- Born: Jacques Garelli; 2 June 1931; Belgrade, Kingdom of Yugoslavia
- Died: 24 December 2014 (aged 83); Paris, France
- Occupations: Poet, philosopher

Jacques Garelli (June 2, 1931 – December 24, 2014) was a French-language poet and philosopher, author of more than fifteen works.

== Biography ==
A former UNESCO expert in Zaire (Africa) with the historian of Africa Aurelio Pace, the father of the artist Joseph Pace, he taught at Yale University (United States), New York University (NYU - USA) and Amiens University (France). Influenced by the thought of Martin Heidegger and of Maurice Merleau-Ponty, the main object of his philosophical research remains phenomenology and ontology.

== Bibliography ==
=== Poetry ===
- Brèche, Paris, Mercure de France, 1966
- Les Dépossessions suivi de Prendre appui, Paris, Mercure de France, 1968
- Lieux Précaires, Paris, Mercure de France, 1972
- L’Ubiquité d’être suivi de Difficile Séjour, Paris, José Corti, 1986
- Archives du Silence suivi de Récurrences du Songe, Paris, José Corti, 1989
- L’Entrée en Démesure, suivi de L’Écoute et le regard, Paris, José Corti, 1995
- Brèche / Les Dépossessions / Lieux Précaires, Encre Marine, Fougères - La Versanne, 2000
- Fragments d’un corps en archipel suivi de Perception et imaginaire. Réflexions sur un poème oublié de Rimbaud, Paris, José Corti, 2008
- Fulgurations de l'être, José Corti, 2011

== Philosophy / Aesthetics ==
- La Gravitation Poétique, Paris, Mercure de France, 1966
- Le Recel et la Dispersion, Paris, Gallimard, « Bibliothèque des Idées », 1978
- Artaud et la Question du Lieu, Paris, José Corti, 1982
- Le Temps des Signes, Paris, Klincksieck, 1983
- Rythmes et Mondes, Grenoble, Jérôme Millon, 1991
- Introduction au Logos du Monde esthétique. De la Chôra platonicienne au Schématisme transcendantal kantien et à l’expérience phénoménologique du Monde, Paris, Beauchêsne, 2000
- De l’entité à l’événement. La phénoménologie à l’épreuve de la science et de l’art contemporains, Milan / Paris, Mimesis, 2004
- La mort et le songe, Milan / Paris, Mimesis, 2007
