= Adalberto Garelli =

Founder of the Garelli Motorcycles

Alberto Garelli
- Born: Adalberto Garelli; January 13, 1886; Mondoví Italy
- Died: January 13, 1968 (aged 81); Bogliasco Italy
- Education: Engineering degree
- Occupation: Entrepreneur
- Years active: 1919–1968
- Website: www.garelli.com

Adalberto Garelli (July 10, 1886 – January 13, 1968) was an Italian engineer and entrepreneur who patented a gearbox and a Split-single engine. Garelli founded the motorcycle company Garelli Motorcycles in 1919.

== Education ==
Garelli graduated from college with a degree in engineering in 1909.

== Business career ==
After graduating with an engineering degree in 1909, Garelli went to work for Fiat. Garelli left Fiat in 1911 when they did not express interest in his ideas for a 2 stroke motor. Between 1911 and 1919 Garelli worked for several motorcycle companies: Bianchi and Stucchi. During this time Garelli patented a 3 speed gearbox and a 2 stroke 2 cylinder engine.

From 1911 to 1914, Garelli patented a split single engine which used a single connecting rod and long wrist pin which passed through both pistons. He produced a 350 cc (21 cu in) split-single motorcycle engine for road use and racing from 1918 to 1926.

By 1919 Garelli started his own motorcycle engine company named Garelli. In the 1960s and 1980s Garelli's motorcycle company won many awards for long distance and Grand Prix motorcycle racing.

== Honors ==
From 1930 to 1933 Garelli was the President of the Italian Cycling Federation.
