= Carla Garelli =

Carla Garelli is a teen model from Paraguay. She is the winner of Miss Teen International 2016. The award ceremony was held at Hotel Sol de Inca in Peru. She is the daughter of model Paola Hermann. She won the title among 18 participants. She was representing her country Paraguay. She is known as the face of local brands and catwalks in fashion parades.
