= Garelli Motorcycles =

Italian motorcycle company

Garelli
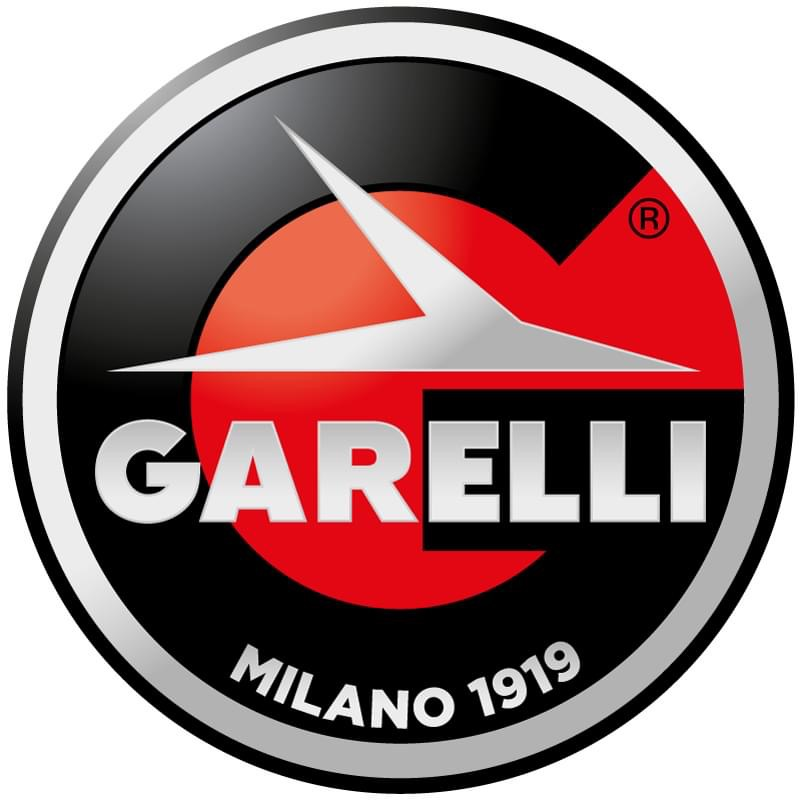
- Company type: Joint-stock company
- Industry: Motorcycle
- Founded: 1919; 107 years ago, Sesto San Giovanni
- Founder: Adalberto Garelli
- Headquarters: Sesto San Giovanni, Italy
- Products: Motorcycles, Scooters, Electric motorcycles and scooters & E-bike
- Website: www.garelli.com

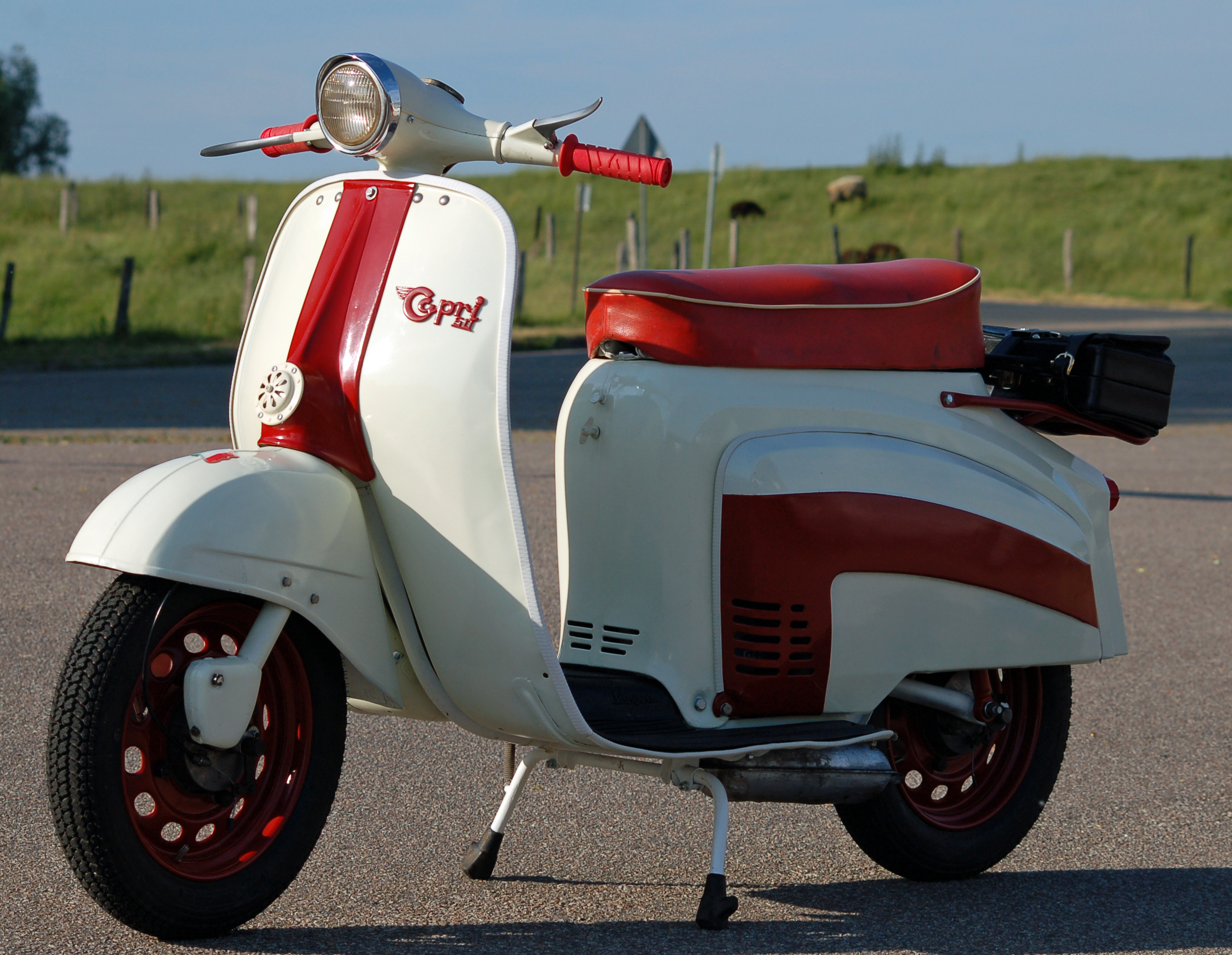
Garelli Capri 1968

Garelli Motorcycles is an Italian moped and motorcycle manufacturer. It was founded in 1919 by Adalberto Garelli (10 July 1886 – 13 January 1968).

== History ==
At age 22, Adalberto Garelli received a degree in engineering and dedicated his work to developing and perfecting the two-stroke engine for Fiat. Garelli quit in 1911 due to Fiat's lack of enthusiasm for the two-stroke engine. He continued his own engine design between 1911 and 1914 which resulted in the 350 cc split-single cylinder engine. Garelli worked for other motorcycle manufacturers from 1914 to 1918 during which time he won a competition organized by the Royal Italian Army to design a motorcycle with which he used his 350 cc split-single engine.

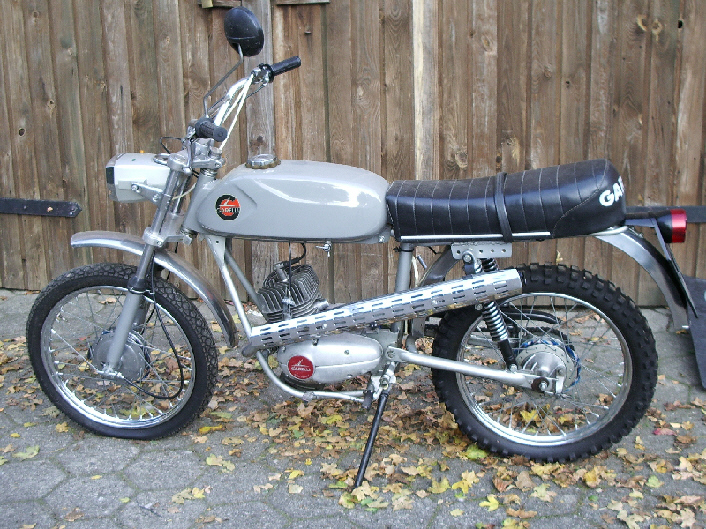
Garelli Cross 1968.

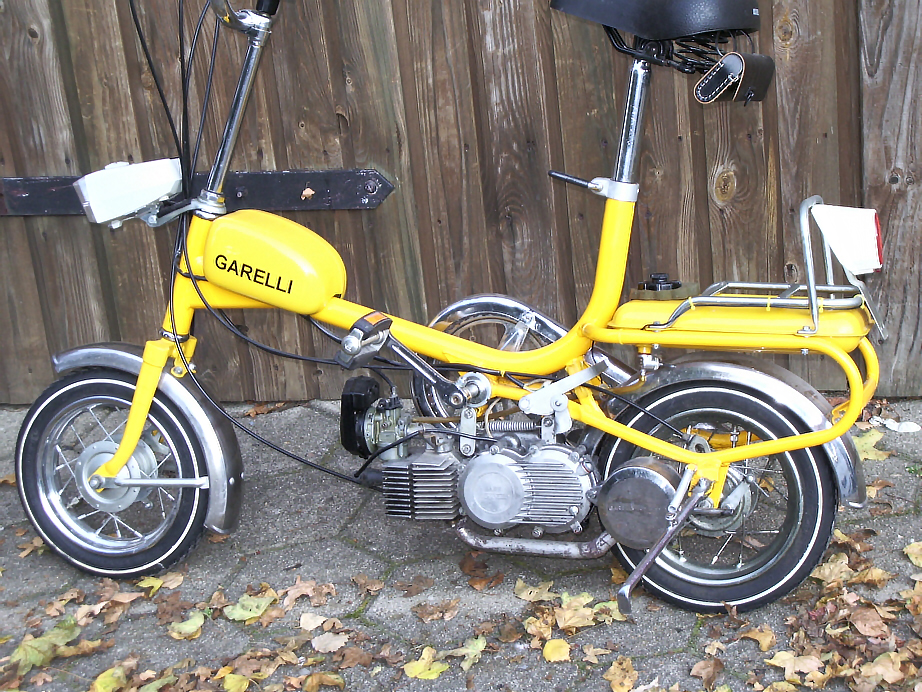
Garelli City Bike 1972.

In 1919, Garelli constructed a 350 cc motorcycle which set a long-distance record from Milan to Naples. Rider Ettore Girardi covered the 840 km (520 mi) with an average of 38.29 km/h (24 mph). Many famous Italian racers, such as Ernesto Gnesa, Tazio Nuvolari and Achille Varzi, began their racing careers on Garelli bikes. The Garelli 350 cc split-single stayed in production until 1926 and made a major impact in racing. The company also produced motorcycles for the Royal Italian Army. After World War II, Garelli concentrated on producing smaller bikes and mopeds for the European market.

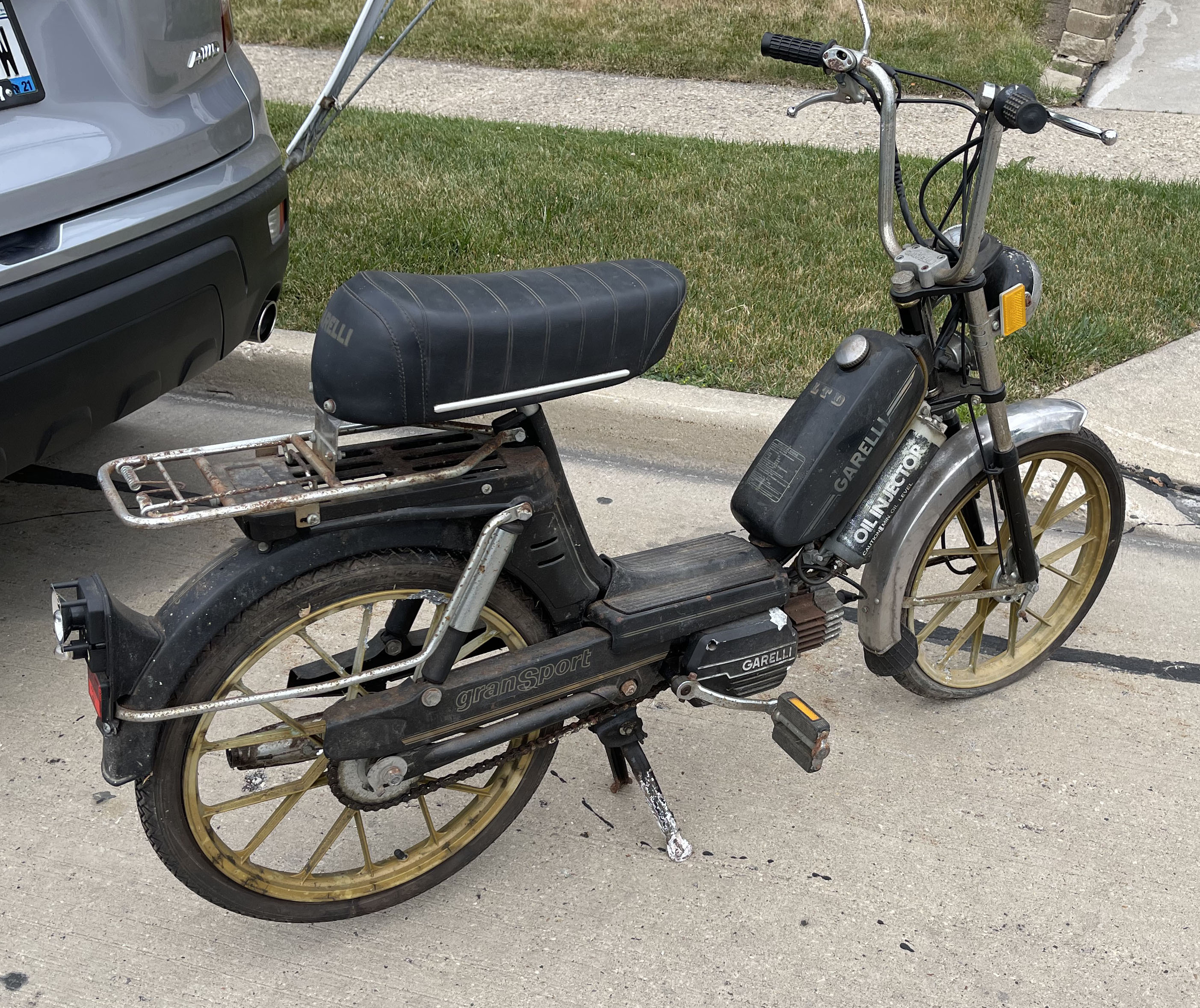
1980 Garelli Grand Sport LTD Moped

In the 1970s Garelli produced the Tiger Cross MK 1 which was an off-road 2 stroke enduro motorcycle. The Tiger Cross was produced in 1976. The motorcycle was painted black and yellow.

In 2019, in the centenary year of the foundation, the brand returned to the market with fully electric products: Ciclone Sic58 and E-Bike Ciclone Sic58. In collaboration with the Marco Simoncelli Foundation.

== Racing and endurance history ==
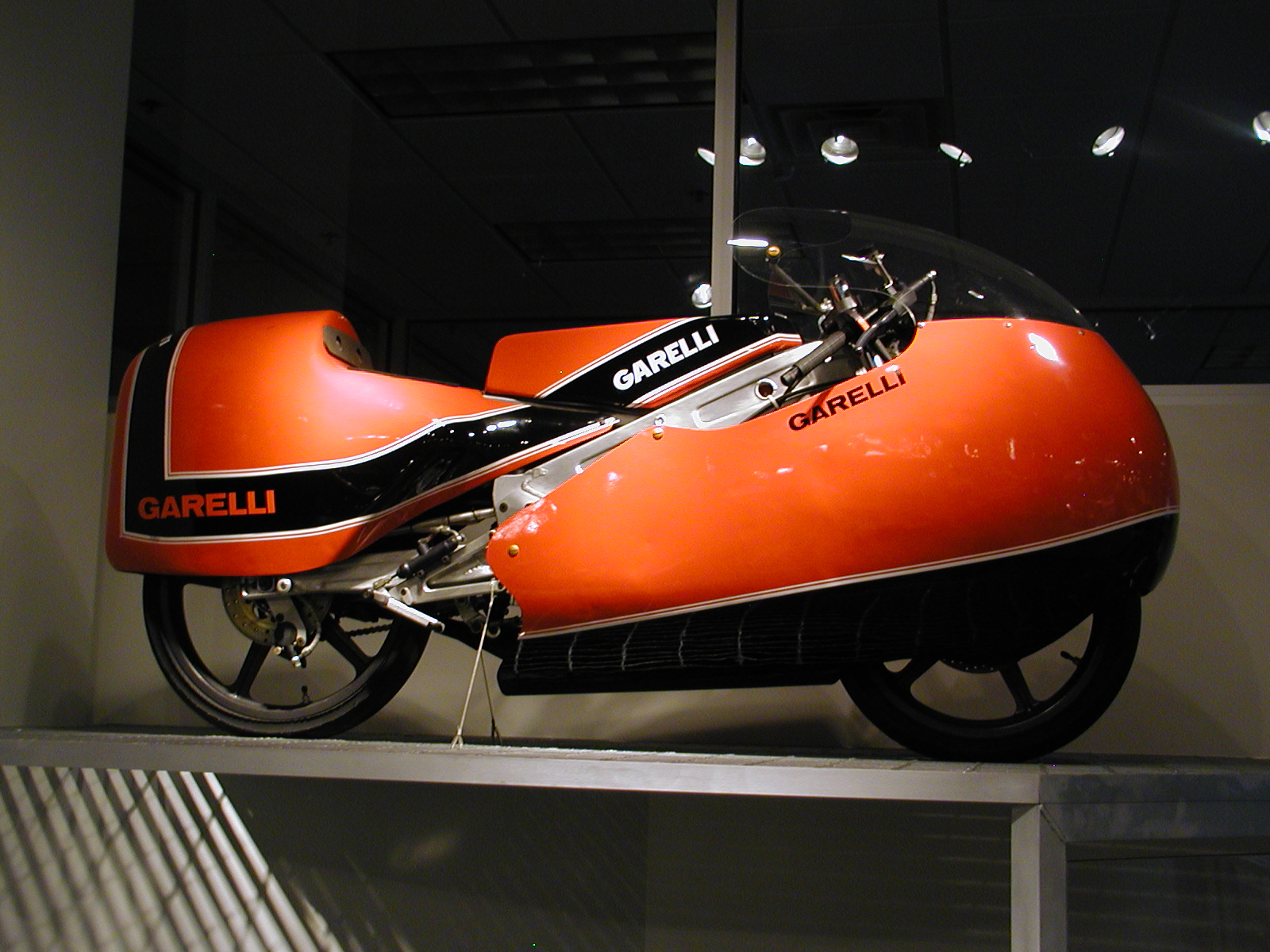
1986 Garelli Racer 01

Garelli set eight world long-distance records on November 3, 1963, with 2 50 cm3 motorcycles.

In the early 1980s, Garelli dominated the 125 class in Grand Prix motorcycle racing winning six consecutive world championships between 1982 and 1987.

=== MotoGP World Championship ===
Garelli won the following World Titles in the 125 cc class:

Year	Champion	Motorcycle
1982	(Spain) Ángel Nieto	
1983	(Spain) Ángel Nieto	
1984	(Spain) Ángel Nieto	
1985	(Italy) Fausto Gresini	
1986	(Italy) Luca Cadalora	
1987	(Italy) Fausto Gresini	

=== MotoGP World Constructors champions ===
- 50 cc class
  - 1983
- 125 cc class
  - 1982, 1983, 1984, 1985, 1986, 1987

== See also ==
- List of Italian companies
- List of motorcycle manufacturers
- List of scooter manufacturers
- Types of motorcycles
