= Cypriot National Guard =

Combined military forces of Cyprus

- Greek: Εθνική Φρουρά
- Emblem of the National Guard of Cyprus

- Flag of the National Guard General Staff
- Motto: Αμύνεσθαι περί πάτρης (lit. 'Defend the Homeland')
- Founded: 15 June 1964
- Service branches: Cypriot Ground Forces; Cyprus Air Command; Cyprus Naval Command
- Headquarters: Nicosia, Cyprus
- Website: Official website

Leadership
- Minister of Defence: Vasilis Palmas
- Chief of the Cypriot National Guard: Lieutenant General Emmanouel Theodorou

Personnel
- Military age: 18 years old
- Conscription: 14 months
- Active personnel: 12,000
- Reserve personnel: 60,000

Expenditure
- Budget: €628.1 Million
- Percent of GDP: 2.0%

Industry
- Domestic suppliers: 3rd Technician Area Workshop of the Cypriot National Guard
- Foreign suppliers: Greece; Israel; European Union; Serbia; Switzerland; United States; United Kingdom Formerly: Russia

Related articles
- Ranks: Cyprus military ranks

The National Guard of Cyprus (Greek: Εθνική Φρουρά, romanized: Ethniki Froura), also known as the Greek Cypriot National Guard or simply the National Guard, is the military force of the Republic of Cyprus. It consists of air, land, sea and special forces elements, and is highly integrated with its first and second line reserves, as well as supporting civilian agencies and paramilitary forces.

The mission of the National Guard is to take all necessary measures for the defense of the Republic of Cyprus for the purpose of dealing with a threatened invasion or any action directed against the independence or territorial integrity of the Republic or threatening to secure the life or property of citizens of the Republic. The main threat to Cyprus comes from the presence of 40,000 Turkish troops occupying northern Cyprus.

Greece currently maintains a garrison of 950 men in the Republic of Cyprus under the designation Hellenic Force in Cyprus (ELDYK), but this is not officially part of the Cyprus military and mostly takes orders from Greece's Hellenic Army General Staff.

== History ==
The National Guard was established in 1964 as a force composed predominantly of ethnic Greeks, following the Cyprus crisis of 1963–1964 and the breakdown of social and political relations between Greek Cypriots and Turkish Cypriots on the island of Cyprus. As outlined by the tripartite Treaty of Alliance (1960) and defined by the early Constitution of 1960–1963, Cyprus was entitled to an army of 2,000 men, to be made up of 60% Greek and 40% Turkish personnel. The Cyprus army was a short-lived volunteer force from 1960-4. The first elected President of the Republic of Cyprus Archbishop Makarios III, proposed thirteen constitutional amendments to the 1960 constitution, which would have adjusted the distribution of manpower and voting power for all civil and military services. This adjustment was aimed at giving greater representation and influence to the Greek Cypriot majority, which at the time formed around 82% of the island's indigenous population.

== Military service ==
Military service in the Republic of Cyprus is mandatory for males. Today, the obligatory service period is 14 months. Currently, only Greek Cypriots serve in the military. Legally, the Greek Cypriot community comprises the ethnic Greek population as well as Cypriots belonging to three Christian minorities—the Armenians, and Catholics of the Latin and Maronite Churches. Since 2008, service is mandatory for all members of the Greek Cypriot community and not only for ethnic Greek Cypriots. The current supreme commander is a Greek military commander, as have been all of his predecessors.

Cyprus participates in the establishment of the permanent structured cooperation. Introduced by the Treaty of Lisbon, PESCO is the most important initiative in promoting the establishment of a European defence policy.

The Cyprus National Guard has since 2016 aimed to move towards semi-professionalization, in the scope of this change, the military serviced time was reduced from 24 months to 14 months, whilst about 3,000 professional soldiers were hired. Even though long wished for by the public, these changes have been said to be no more than a political expediency. The way in which the semi-professionalization has been conducted has been illustrated as unprofessional and undermining the ability of the force, by academic researchers. Europe's defence is present in Cyprus through Permanent Structured Cooperation. The government had argued for it to increase deterrence against any intervention on the island. Cyprus has made available the military base in Paphos and the naval base in Zygi, along with other facilities. These have been upgraded and equipped with electronic surveillance systems.

The force has in recent years experienced exponential draft dodging (in Greek: φυγοστρατία). Many policies have been designed, yet the issue has not been effectively managed.

== Components ==
=== Organisation of active forces ===
The National Guard is an interdisciplinary force. It consists of the Army, Navy and Air Force as mentioned above. The General Staff of the National Guard is the supreme hierarchical step and includes the Chief, the Staff, the Arms / Body Divisions and Organizations and its Organizational Units.

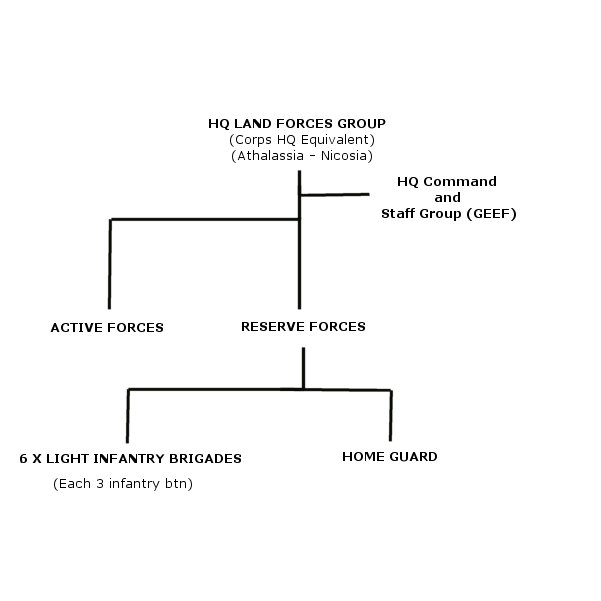
Over- simplified Organisational Structure of Cyprus National Guard.

The force heavily relies on the Reserves (Εφεδρεία), making up the biggest percentage of Human Resources in the case of full mobilisation of the National Guard.

Army- It consists of a number of Brigade Formations and Regular Regimental Groups:

- 1st Mechanized Infantry Brigade (Ιη Μ/Κ Ταξιαρχια ΠΖ)
- 2nd Mechanized Infantry Brigade (IIη M/K Ταξιαρχία ΠΖ)
- 3rd Support Brigade (IIIη Ταξιαρχία ΥΠ)
- 4th Infantry Brigade (IVη Ταξιαρχία ΠΖ)
- 6th Mechanized Infantry Brigade (VIη M/K Ταξιαρχία ΠΖ)
- 7th Mechanized Infantry Brigade (VIIη M/K Ταξιαρχία ΠΖ)
- 20th Armored Brigade (XXη ΤΘ Ταξιαρχία)
- Hellenic Force of Cyprus (ELDYK- ΕΛΔΥΚ) - Mechanized Group (battalion plus) Formation
- 2nd Infantry Regiment (2ο Τ.Σ Σύνταγμα ΠΖ)
- 8th Infantry Regiment (8ο Τ.Σ Σύνταγμα ΠΖ)
- Military Police (Στρατονομία)
- Special Forces Command - 1 Regiment (Διοίκηση Kαταδρομών)
- Artillery Command (Διοίκηση Πυροβολικού)
- Engineers Command (Διοίκηση Μηχανικού)
- Military Music Department of the National Guard
- Signal Command (Διοίκηση Επικοινωνιών Πληροφορικής)
- Medical Bureau (Διεύθυνση Υγειονομικού)
- Home Guard Bureau (Διεύθυνση Εθνοφυλακής)

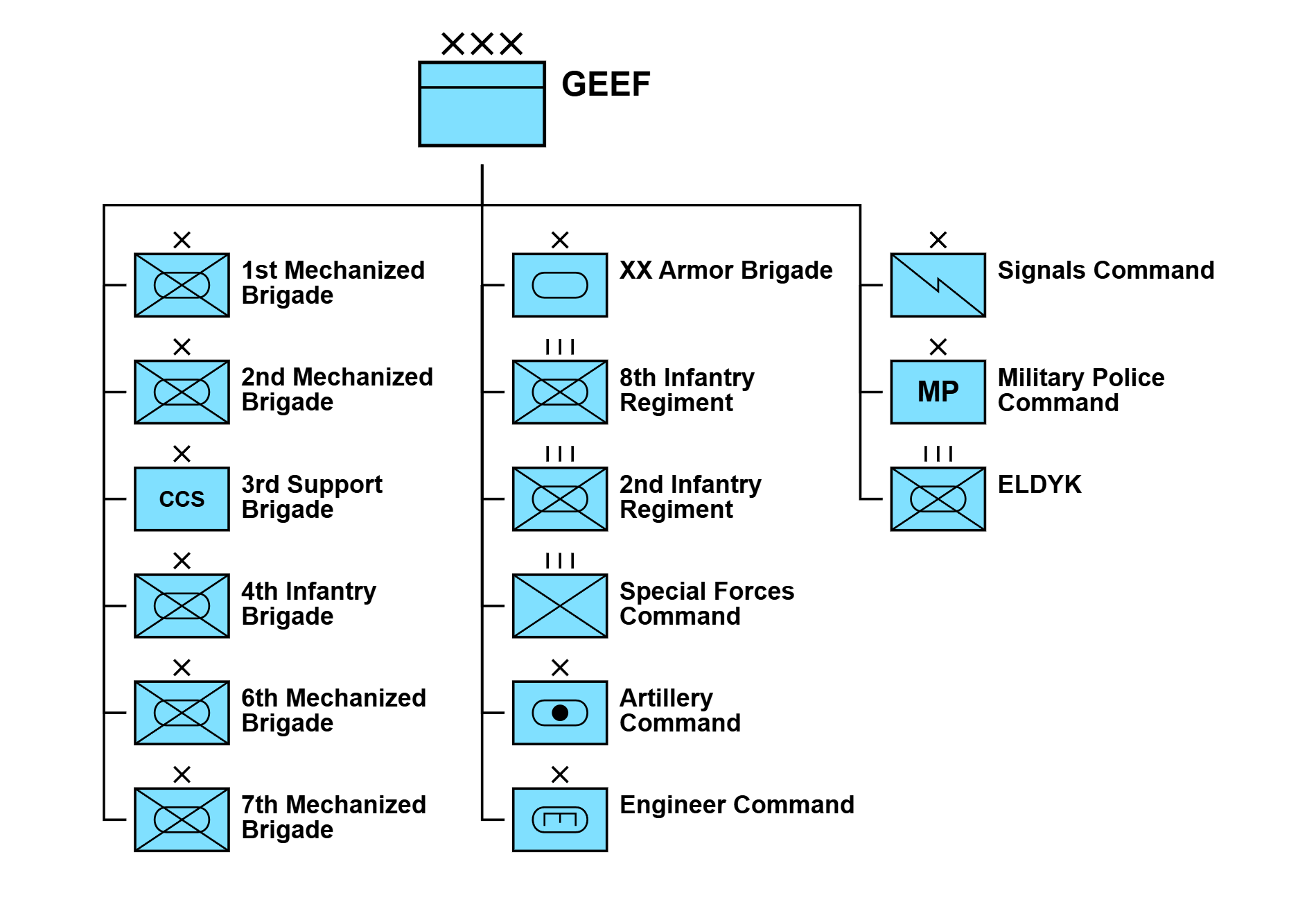
Cypriot National Guard (click to enlarge),Ref.

Navy- It consists of:

- Naval Command (Διοίκηση Ναυτικού)
- Navy Units (Marine Base Administration, Coastal Surveillance Administration, Emergency Arms Command, and Underwater Demolition Command/ Navy SEALs).

Air Force- It consists of:

- Air Command (Διοίκηση Αεροπορίας)
- Units (including Attack Helicopters - Aircraft, Air Force Patrols, Air Control System, and Operational Support Degrees).

== Operational history ==
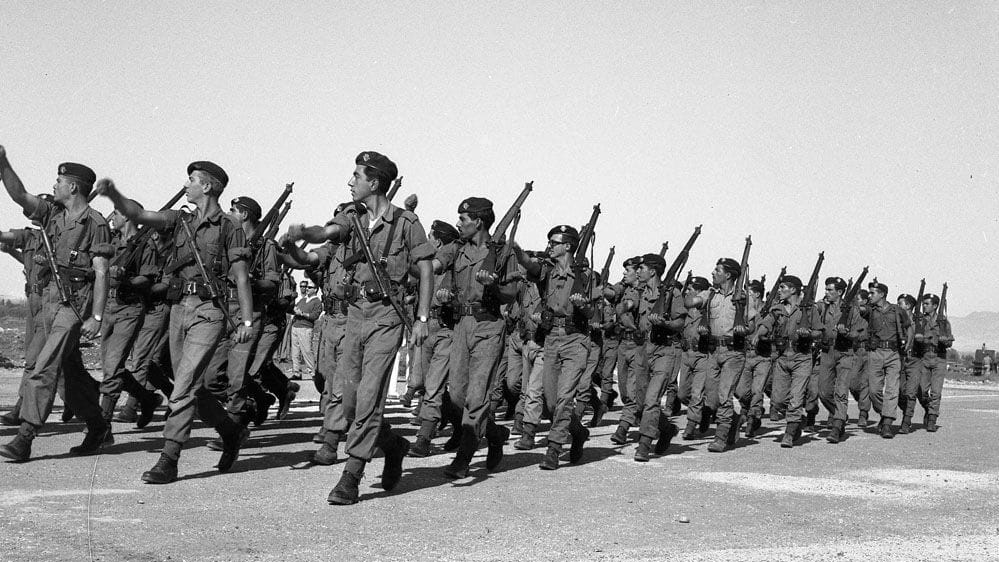
Soldiers of the National Guard armed with Sten submachine guns and Lee-Enfield bolt action rifles marching in 1967.

=== Early operational history (1963–1974) ===
The Cypriot National Guard, in its existent form, was initially mobilised circa mid-1963 as a Greek Cypriot infantry force with some small elements dedicated to artillery, anti-armour and light armour forces. This force inherited some mixed equipment from its pre-civil war organisation, including 54 British-made 25-pounder gun-howitzers, 40 Marmon-Herrington Armoured Car (Mk. IVF), 4 Shorland light armoured cars, 2 Daimler Dingo light armoured cars, 5 C-17 light armoured trucks and a variety of machine guns, mortars and a few anti-tank weapons (namely M20 Super Bazookas and a small number of PIAT weapons). The Greek Cypriots also possessed some Bofors 40mm anti-aircraft guns, along with a variety of Bedford trucks and old US made jeeps.

The Cyprus Naval Command became active circa 1963, following the outbreak of civil conflict between extremists within the Greek and Turkish ethnic communities of the island. At the outset of operational status, the Cyprus Naval Command was manned by Greek Navy officers and junior officers, whilst the sailors were primarily Greek Cypriot conscripts of educated backgrounds. The first equipment made available to the Cyprus Naval Command was a set of three ex-German WW2-era R-boats (two of the R-151 class called P-01 Arion and P-02 Phaethon, and one of the R-218 class under the name Dedalos). All three vessels were in service by August 1964, having been purchased from a shipyard in Piraeus, Greece by a private sponsor named A. Leventis. The three vessels were in poor condition due to their age, and had to be refurbished in Greece before delivery to Cyprus.

==== Tillyria ====
On 6 August 1964, the Cypriot National Guard was mobilised to intervene in the ongoing inter-ethnic confrontation at Kokkina, a Turkish-Cypriot controlled fortified enclave on the south-western edge of Morphou Bay in the north-west of the island with its commander, being General George Grivas.

Kokkina was regarded by Grivas as a major coastal beachhead for Turkey to land weapons in Cyprus, with the aim of arming the Turkish Cypriots. For this reason, he persuaded the military government in Athens to authorise an all-out assault on Kokkina, with the aim of eliminating the beachhead, and preventing more weapons being delivered to Turkish Cypriot militia groups.

The military confrontation at Kokkina in August 1964 between Greek Cypriot and Turkish Cypriot forces saw the Greek-Cypriot force mobilised for the first time to attempt to eliminate a fortified coastal enclave in the Tylliria region of the island, in an effort to stop Turkish vessels putting ashore there to offload food, weapons and ammunition for the Turkish Cypriot militia units active in that region. As a necessity of mounting such an assault, Grivas required a naval presence off the coast of Kokkina, in order to bombard the enclave from the sea, and to prevent any other shipping from interfering. Consequently, the Phaethon and the Arion were utilised in the assault and commenced their assault with broadsides of 40mm and 20mm gunfire into the enclave on 6 August. This action was coordinated with battery fire from six land-based 25-pounder guns and around a dozen mortars used by ground forces to besiege the enclave from the south and south-west. The siege continued until 8 August during which the Turkish Government opted to intervene with air strikes, as it became clear to all parties that Kokkina's defences were likely to collapse, regardless of a UN presence in the area. The Turkish Air Force dispatched a number of formations of F-100 Super Sabres to commence air strikes against the Cypriot ground and naval forces, in broad daylight and flying at low level.

The first formation of F-100 Super Sabres spotted the Phaethon near to a small fisheries harbour west of Kokkina. The Phaethon commenced evasive manoeuvres and put up 20mm cannon fire, but was struck in the engines by strafing rockets, napalm and going into flames, killing seven of her crew. One of the four survivors then piloted the ship with a single functioning engine to run aground next to the harbour, so that the crew could be recovered by local fishermen.

Minutes after the attack on the Phaethon, a second formation of F-100s spotted the Cypriot gunboat Arion further up the coast towards Kokkina. The Arion was strafed with guns and rockets, causing superficial damage. As the Arion successfully made her escape using evasive manoeuvres, an F-100C Super Sabre, piloted by Cpt. Cengiz Topel of 112 Filo was shot down by a Cypriot 40mm anti-aircraft gun emplacement on the shoreline.

The loss of the Phaethon was a severe shock to the National Guard leadership, and was compounded by further casualties and material losses at Kato Pyrgos, a nearby Greek Cypriot village which was bombarded on 8 and 9 August in an effort to dislodge National Guardsmen using its hilltops for directing artillery fire with radios. The Cypriot National Guard solidified a perimeter of containment around Kokkina, leaving the Turkish Cypriot village isolated from the rest of the island, and buffered only a narrow UN demilitarized zone after successfully achieving its objectives.

==== Post Tillyria (1964 - Early 1974) ====
Aware of the glaring deficiency of their military capabilities, the leadership of the Cypriot National Guard under General Georgios Grivas was able to compel the civilian Government of Cyprus, under Archbishop Makarios to seek out foreign assistance for a massive armament campaign. Since Cyprus could not afford major weapons purchases under her own depleted national budget, Makarios was forced to dispatch an envoy on 1 October 1964 to the Soviet Union to request military assistance. This move resulted in rapid Soviet assistance, widely regarded by Western countries as a step towards a Cold War alliance between Cyprus and Russia.

As soon as 23–24 December 1964, a Soviet Navy freighter arrived at Limassol Port carrying the first batch of arms intended to re-equip the National Guard. These supplies included 4 unidentified armoured vehicles, and 130 ZIL heavy trucks, along with sufficient number of crates to fill 36 Bedford trucks. After this initial delivery, arms transfers made by the Soviet Navy to Cyprus accelerated, with freighters travelling via Alexandria in Egypt to Limassol under cover of night. These deliveries included a full package of Soviet-made radars and radio systems to complement the structural and strategic requirements of a reinforced National Guard. In addition, a consignment of 32 Soviet-made T-34/85 medium tanks (from Yugoslav surplus) were delivered along with 40 BTR-152 armoured personnel carriers, as well as a batch of 30 M1944 100-mm field guns, 40 modern 3M6 Shmel anti-tank missile firing units, a batch of ZPU-1 14.5mm anti-aircraft guns and a consignment of around 4500 Czech surplus vz. 58 assault rifles, as well as machine guns and mortars.

After 1965, and until 1974, the civilian Government of Archbishop Makarios became increasingly alienated by the relationship between the National Guard leadership and the ruling military Government of Greece. Few funds were made available to secure other armaments of technical support, and the National Guard was forced to develop alternative means to armament and self-sustainment. A Technical Corps was established to produce and retrofit a series of improvised armoured vehicles from unneeded ATS-712 Soviet tractors, resulting in 10 locally produced "TS" armoured personnel carriers. A lack of spare parts meant that by the time of the 1974 military coup against Archbishop Makarios, the National Guard was experiencing severe technical difficulties with its T-34 tanks. The problem for the National Guard was further compounded by the refusal of Makarios' loyalist paramilitary force to hand over some 4500 Czech automatic rifles and a variety of other weapons which had been kept at a warehouse near Nicosia Airport, and which were handed over to the UN in January 1972.

=== Coup and invasion in 1974 ===
On 15 July 1974, the Cypriot National Guard, under its own leadership and in conjunction with the EOKA-B ultra-nationalist organisation, overthrew the civilian Government of Archbishop Makarios in Nicosia and attempted to assassinate him by using tanks and infantry to storm the Presidential Palace. Makarios escaped, but the confrontation in Nicosia resulted in multiple casualties as the National Guard units engaged in a gunfight with Makarios' loyalist forces. Since Kyrenia in the north of the island was not expected to present much armed resistance to the coup, many forces which were stationed there to fend off a threatened Turkish invasion were sent to Nicosia on 15 and 16 July to enforce the coup in the Capital. Kyrenia was thus, poorly defended when the Turkish invasion began on 20 July.

Makarios escaped an initial attempt to capture him at the Archbishopric in Nicosia, and fled to Paphos. The naval patrol vessel Leventis (No.15) was quickly dispatched to Paphos to begin shelling a radio station there which was being operated by pro-Makarios elements.

On 20 July 1974, Turkey invaded Cyprus in a surprise-attack, without issuing a declaration of war. A naval force of Turkish vessels was detected by coastal radar at Apostolos Andreas approaching the coast, and a second force of naval vessels was sighted off the coast of Kyrenia during the early hours. The Cyprus National Guard Naval Command quickly ordered its two motor torpedo boats, T-1 (under the command of Lieutenant Junior Grade Nicolaos Verikios) and T-3 (under the command of Lieutenant Elefterios Tsomakis), both based at Kyrenia, to attack the Turkish flotilla directly. Both vessels were promptly sunk by combined air and sea attack. The rest of the Cyprus Navy vessels were scuttled by their own crews at Naval Base Chrysulis in Boghazi on 14 August 1974. After the conflict, two boats were re-floated by Turkish troops and transferred to Golcuk Naval Museum, Turkey (on display with incorrect pennant numbers 11 and 12).

Turkey commenced an air and sea invasion of northern Cyprus, under the codename "Attila-1" which had the anticipated aim of seizing Kyrenia as a beachhead with amphibious forces, whilst simultaneously establishing a beachhead from Kyrenia to the northern suburbs of Nicosia (the site of two Turkish fortified enclaves that could be used as strongholds to seize northern Nicosia) using parachute forces. The attack was heavily supported by a daylight air campaign, allowing Cypriot A/A flak to be suppressed to the extent that Turkish transport planes could drop parachute forces north of Nicosia in broad daylight from 20 July to 23 July. In disarray, the Greek Cypriot military leadership enacted the "Aphrodite-2" defence plan to coordinate a containment and resistance to the invasion forces. This plan, however, proved to be ineffective in either containing or repelling the Turkish forces already ashore. At the same time, the Greek Cypriot EOKA-B forces, subordinate to their own de facto leadership, enacted their own interpretation of the existing Aphrodite defence plan (sometimes referred to historically as Aphrodite-3 or Hephaestus) and attacked multiple Turkish Cypriot enclaves simultaneously, causing heavy Turkish Cypriot non-combatant casualties and rounding up an estimated 20,000 Turkish Cypriot POWs who were interred at Limassol until later that year. Cypriot National Guard forces, supported by a smaller number of Greek troops, were able to prevent the loss of Nicosia (Including the International Airport which initially was successfully defended by elements of the Cyprus National Guard, later to be joined by ELDYK) and the Kato Pyrgos corridor during the second Turkish offensive, and stopped the offensive aimed at Larnaka, but were unable to support Famagusta due to lack of sufficient weaponry.

As a result of the operations during the summer of 1974, the Cyprus National Guard had gained important operational experience and despite the loss of territory, surprised NATO with its tenacious defense without air power, naval power, a severe lack of armour, and being outnumbered some 4-1.

=== Post-war (1974–2004) ===
Immediately following the 1974 conflict, the Cypriot National Guard experienced a major depletion of its military capability due to lack of equipment and ammunition, compounded by the wartime economic collapse of the country. A small armored unit of 11 surviving T-34/85 tanks continued to operate in service until circa 1985, albeit in poor mechanical condition with lack of spare parts. Small numbers of other armored vehicles (including re-engined Marmon Herrington Mk-IV F armored cars) and artillery guns from the pre-war period also continued in service until the economic revival of the Cyprus Republic in the mid-1980s.

In 1978, Egyptian commando forces raided Larnaca International Airport in an effort to seize a hijacked Greek Cypriot airliner. Greek Cypriot commando forces (LOK) resisted the Egyptian forces, resulting in a sustained gun battle with the death of 15 Egyptian commandos and 3 Egyptian Air Force aircrew and an additional 15 Egyptian commandos hospitalised, an Egyptian C130 destroyed and Egyptian Jeeps destroyed. Cairo had severed diplomatic relations with Nicosia for a number of years but eventually they were restored. Today, Egypt and Cyprus share a very close strategic relationship.

In the early 1980s, Cyprus sought new suppliers of arms in order to circumvent US and European embargoes, combined with an apparent unwillingness by the Soviet Union to supply further aid. From Brazil, a large consignment of new light armored vehicles was ordered in 1982, 15 EE-3 Jararaca armored reconnaissance vehicles (delivered 1984–1985), and 126 EE-9 Cascavel armored fighting vehicles (delivered 1984–1988).

Faced with an urgent need for infantry-portable air-defense equipment, the Cypriot Government was able to procure 20 firing units of Strela-2/SA-7B Grail anti-aircraft missiles along with 324 live rounds from neighboring Syria in 1984.

Major arms orders were also placed with France, one of the few European powers still willing to support weapon deliveries to Cyprus. In 1984, Cyprus purchased from France a total of 27 VAB-VCI infantry fighting vehicles with 20mm cannon (delivered 1985–1988) along with 100 VAB-VTT armored personnel carriers (delivered 1985–1988).

In 1987, the first batch of new French tanks were purchased to replace the T-34s that had been removed from service - a total of 15 AMX-30B2 main battle tanks and 1 AMX-30D recovery vehicle, all delivered the following year. Also in 1987, Cyprus purchased from France a unit of 6 SA-342L Gazelle scout anti-tank helicopters and 18 VAB-VCAC guided-missile tank-destroyers, along with 1200 HOT-2 anti-tank missiles (interchangeable for both airborne and ground launcher platforms), all delivered in 1988. A further 2 VAB-VTT armored personnel carriers were ordered as options in 1987 (delivered in 1988) along with 250 MILAN-2 anti-tank missile rounds and an unknown number of firing units (possibly 45).

In June 1987, the Cyprus National Guard Air Command purchased a batch of six Aerospatiale SA-342L Gazelle scout anti-tank helicopters with 1200 Euromissile HOT-2 wire-guided anti-tank missiles (the interchangeable live rounds to be shared with the Army for use on their VAB-VCAC tank destroyers). The six aircraft were delivered from January 1988 onward, and were issued the serial numbers 351, 352, 353, 354, 355 and 356, drawn from Aerospatiale 21XX and 22XX series construction numbers. Of these aircraft, five examples (excluding 351) have been noted in regular use with the Cyprus National Guard airborne forces, suggesting number 351 had been withdrawn for use as spare parts, or as a technical training air frame, prior to 2004. The Gazelles were delivered in a three-tone desert camouflage consisting of light sand, dark sand and drab-olive tones - this camouflage has been retained to the present day. All aircraft utilize a low-visibility Cyprus flag fin-flash and a low-visibility Hellenic Air Force styled roundel marking at the midsection of the tail boom. The designation SA-342L is inscribed above the fin flash, along with the three-digit serial number.

In 1989, the Cyprus Government ordered a batch of 35 AMX-30B2 main battle tanks and 1 AMX-30D armored recovery vehicle as part of a $115 million US dollar purchase from France. The deal included 12 GIAT Mk F-3 self-propelled 155mm howitzers and 12 AMX-VCI armored personnel carriers. All of the equipment ordered from France in this year was delivered from 1990–1991.

In 1990, Greece supplied Cyprus with 81 ELVO Leonidas-2 (4K-7FA) armored personnel carriers, which were fielded to provide the Greek ELDYK Army Regiment in Cyprus with a Mechanized Infantry vehicle force. These were followed in 1996–1998 by a batch of 52 French-made AMX-30B main battle tanks supplied from Hellenic Army surplus, along with a further 65 new Leonidas-2 armored personnel carriers delivered in 1996–1997.

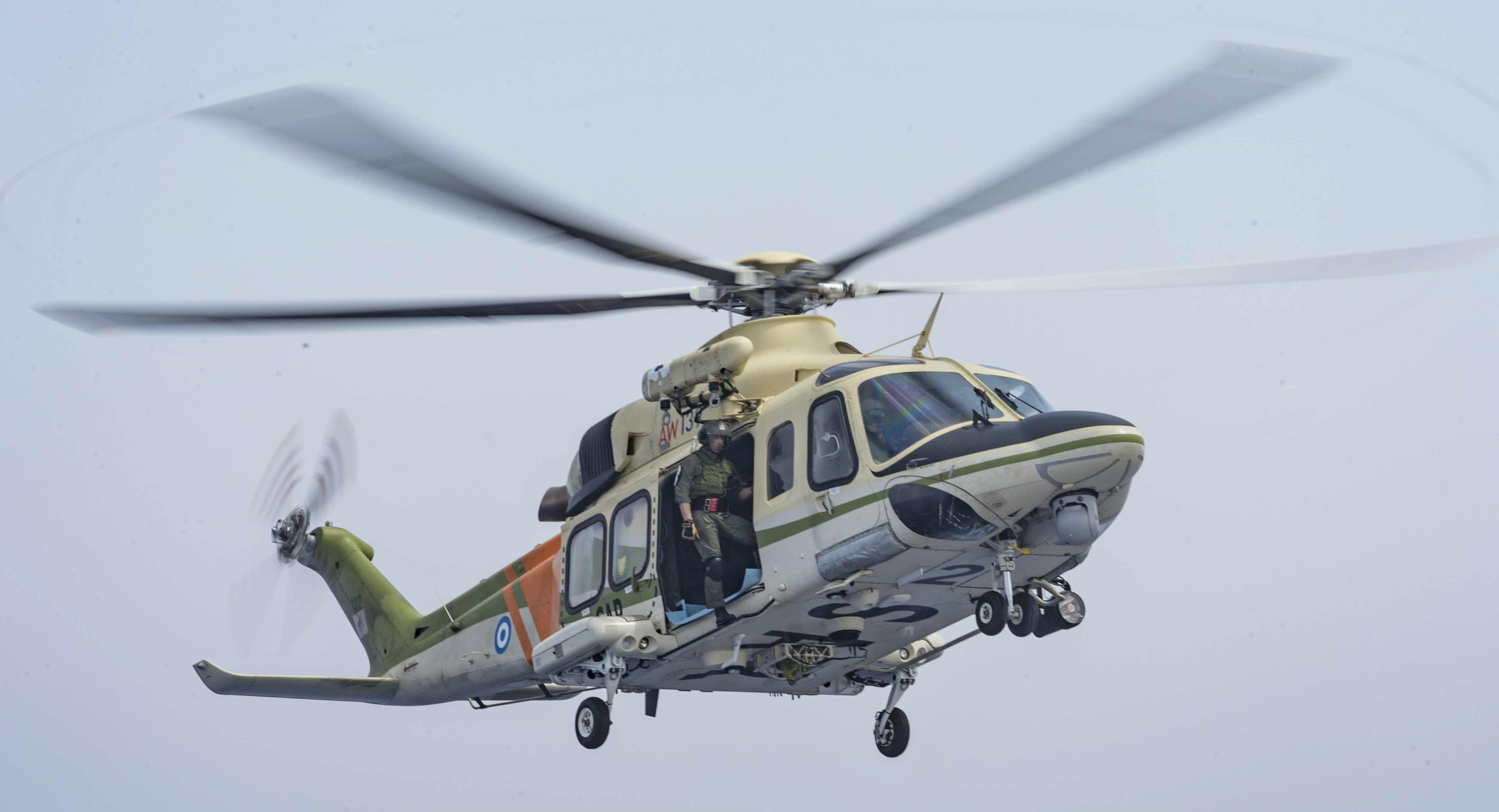
AW-139 helicopter of the National Guard in a Search & Rescue exercise.

In 2001–2002, Cyprus discreetly acquired 12 new-build examples (serial numbers 811–822 inclusively) of the Mil Mi-35P Hind-F attack helicopter type from the Russian Federation, following a lengthy tender process which included reported competition from the Mil Mi-28 Havoc, and Denel Rooivalk. The helicopters were first made public at a surprise three-ship flypast of the funeral of Lt General Evangelos Florakis on 12 July 2002 (himself killed in the crash of Cypriot Air Command Bell-206L Long Ranger "112" on 10 July 2002 whilst observing a command and control exercise at night). The Mi-35s were initially supplied in an unusual matte-black (and presumably infra-red absorbent) camouflage suitable for night operations, but lacked the optional FLIR turret and identification friend-or-foe systems made available for the more advanced Russian Mi-24PN. Aside from their monotone camouflage, the aircraft carried a small, high-contrast Cyprus Republic tail fin flag, and a high visibility Hellenic Air Force styled blue-on-white roundel on the tail at the midpoint. Bright red danger markings were applied to the rotor tips and to the end of the tail boom.

The Cypriot Mi-35 helicopters were initially equipped for the deployment of fixed-mount 30mm heavy cannon, and a capacity for 80mm (3.1 inch) S-8 rockets in AP and HE-FRAG configurations, as well as for anti-tank missiles in the 9K114 and 9M120 versions.

=== European Union membership (2004–2020) ===
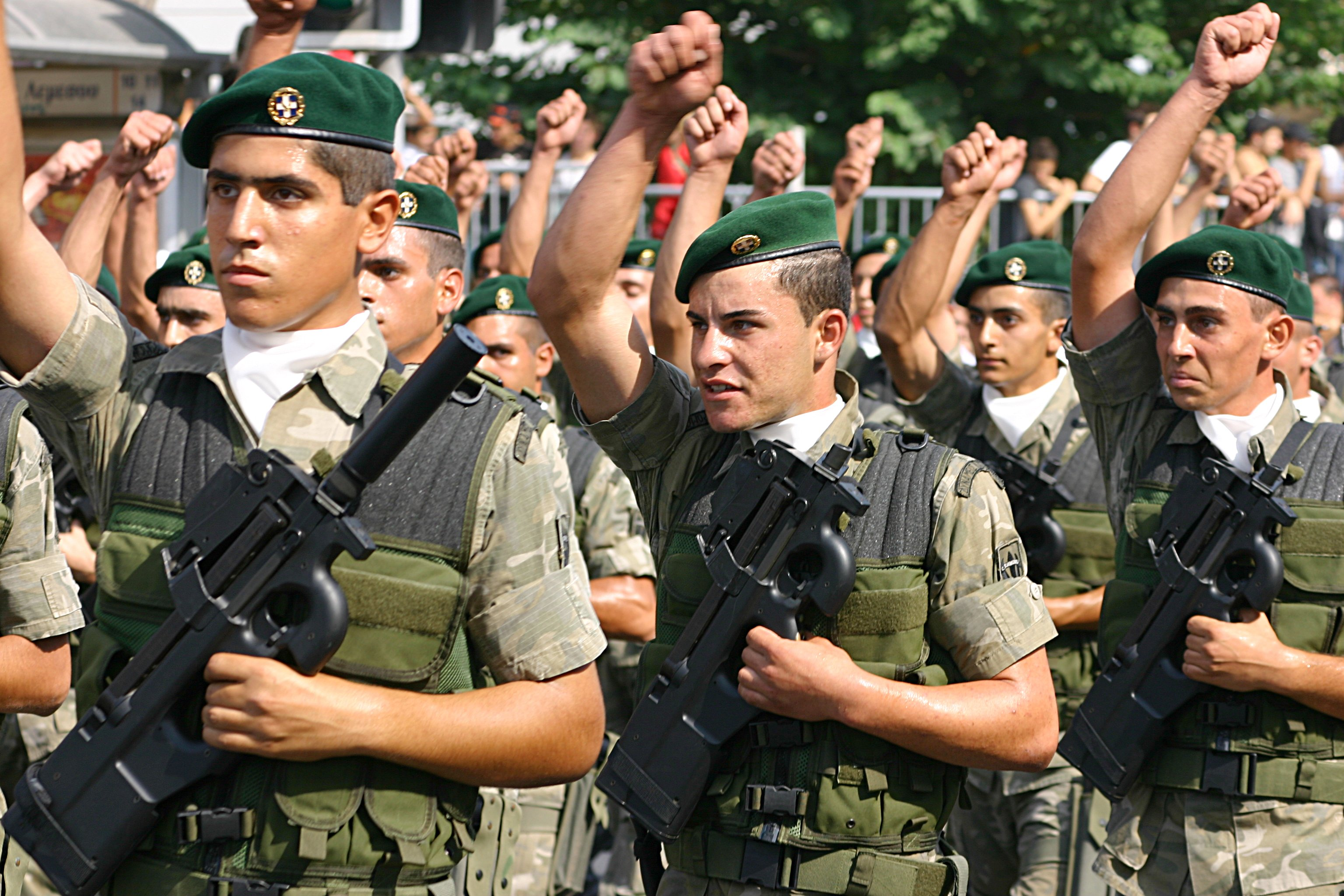
Cyprus National Guard soldiers during the October 1st parade in 2004.

On 10 September 2005, National Guard Pilatus PC-9M turboprop aircraft "902" crashed into a church bell tower while performing an unauthorized flight maneuver near Kollossi in Limassol Cyprus, having deviated 80 km from the planned flight path. The aircraft was destroyed, and its two pilots killed.

On 5 July 2006, a National Guard Mi-35P Hind attack helicopter (serial number 822) crashed near the Paphos-Limassol motorway shortly after departing from Andreas Papandreou Air Base in Paphos. The aircraft was written off and both crew members (a Russian instructor and Cypriot student) killed.

The SA-342L Gazelle anti-tank helicopter force remains in service to present day, although example 356 is no longer thought to be operational. The four remaining Gazelle anti-tank helicopters are thought to have undergone an overhaul, reportedly completed in August 2014 at Valence-Chabeuil airport by Aerotec Group. The four Gazelle helicopters were assigned to 450ME / 1st Platoon, which has been implemented at Andreas Papandreou Air Base (in Paphos district) following the closure of Lakatamia air base (in Nicosia district) in April 2013. Their prior host unit, 449MAE Helicopter Squadron, was disbanded with the closure of Lakatamia AFB.

In February 2017, the Cyprus Navy was given an offshore patrol vessel by the Sultanate of Oman. The Al Mabrukah training and patrol vessel displaced 930 tons and was 62 metres long, making it far larger than any vessel previously operated by the Cyprus Navy. The vessel was refitted and modernised for the donation process and came equipped with a large helicopter pad and expanded accommodation facilities, making it suitable for use as a support ship under its new designation, A620 Alasia. However the low speed of the ship, combined with its age, highlighted mechanical difficulties with the ship's propulsion, and following its use in the TELES-2017 naval exercise in May 2017, the ship was laid up at Larnaca Port, requiring repair.

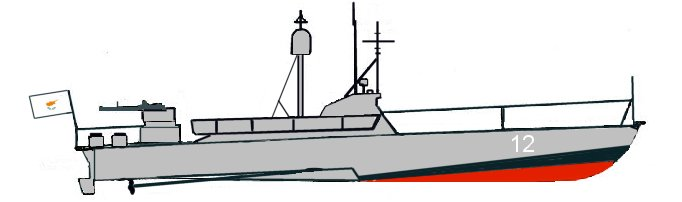
Cyprus Navy P-4 "Skinhead" class Motor Torpedo Boat

On 28 November 2017 the Cypriot Defence Ministry announced the planned acquisition of eight helicopters: four SA-342L Gazelle scout anti-tank helicopters to be acquired from France with night and all-weather capability, and four attack helicopters to be selected by tender. The four existing Gazelle helicopters in the Air Force would be upgraded, and unmanned aerial vehicles (UAVs) were also being sought as part of a combined Unmanned Air System package.

In 2018, the Cyprus Navy received a Sa’ar 62. It was purchased by the Republic of Cyprus through a transnational agreement with Israel and was built by the Israeli shipyards in Haifa. The new vessel has a displacement of 430 tons, an overall length of 62 meters, a maximum speed of 32 knots, and carries up to 30 crewmembers plus a Special Forces unit. Installed on the vessel are multiple systems including 2 Rafael Typhoon Weapon Stations with a single 23mm gun each, radar, two TOPLITE electro-optical payloads, SATCOM, navigation systems, command and control systems, and more. Among others, the vessel is armed with two 12.7mm heavy machine guns but also it is Fitted for But Not With (FFBNW) a Rafael MLS-NLOS system. In late 2018, an option was exercised to purchase a second vessel of the type.

In late 2018, the Cyprus Government purchased 24 Nora B-52 self-propelled 155mm heavy field howitzers from Serbia, along with 8 BOV M16 Miloš MRAPs / Light Armoured Vehicles and an unspecified number of options to purchase additional systems for both types. The acquisition of Nora B-52 was widely reported to be part of a phased refurbishment of the Artillery Command, transitioning to a greater number of self-propelled guns and launcher systems, integrated and better networked for a more sophisticated warfighting capability.

=== 2020–present ===
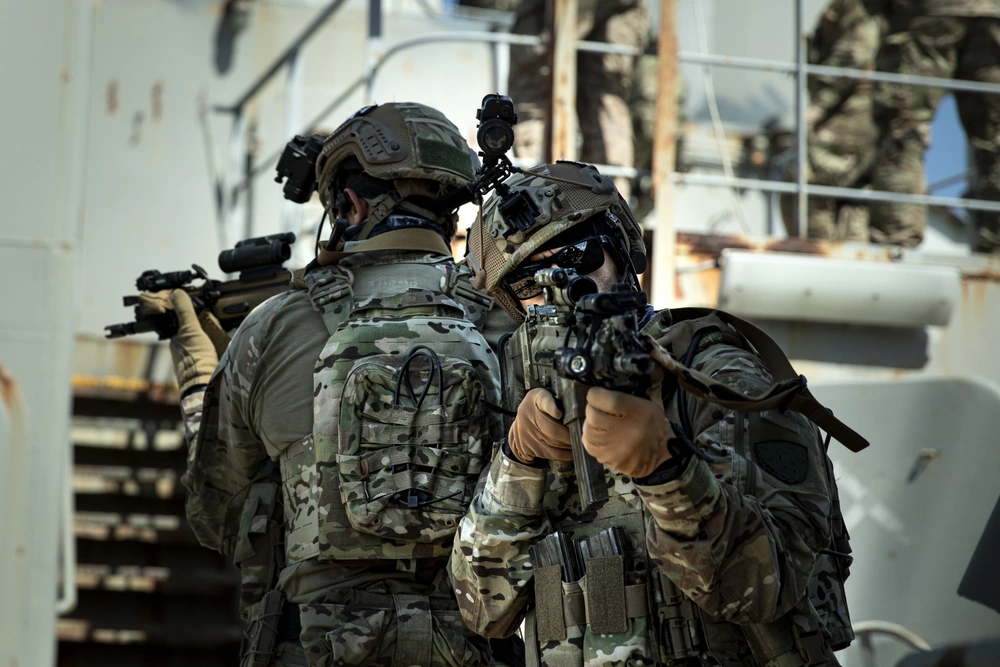
Greek and Cypriot Greek SEALs during an exercise.

In early 2020, Cyprus signed contracts worth more than 240 million Euros to purchase French Mistral MANPADS, Exocet ASMs and a short-medium range SAM system, later identified is the Israeli Barak MX.

In 2023, the Turkish Armed Forces attempted to create a new road that would have connected occupied Arsos straight to Pyla, bypassing the SBAs, when UN forces tried stopping them, the Turkish personnel attacked and wounded 3 UN soldiers and as such the Cypriot National Guard was placed on alert and the change of the Chief of the National Guard was delayed due to the military being placed on alert.

As part of the European Union Military Assistance Mission in support of Ukraine initiative, Greek and Cypriot Greek explosive ordnance disposal experts assisted Ukrainian troops in handling various related scenarios.

The Cypriot National Guard has also been involved in the Cyprus governments "Amalthea" initiative which has been sending aid to people in Gaza.

== Special forces ==
=== Army ===
Special Forces unit flash that is emblazoned with ΔΥΝΑΜΕΙΣ ΚΑΤΑΔΡΟΜΩΝ (Raider Forces).

The Cyprus armed forces operate a pool of three Army Special Forces Groups (plus one auxiliary) known colloquially as LOK (Greek: ΛΟΚ - Λόχοι Ορεινών Καταδρομών, Lochoi Oreinōn Katadromōn). All LOK Groups are part of the Army Special Forces Command DKD (Greek: ΔΚΔ - Διοίκησης Καταδρομών - Diikisis Katadromon), and a soldier belonging to the Brigade is called a Raider (Greek: Kαταδρομέας, Kαταδρομείς - Katadromeas, Katadromeis). Cyprus Special Forces training is based closely on their Greek counterparts. The formation is more commonly referred to as the Raider Forces (Greek: Δυνάμεις Kαταδρομών, translit. Dynameis Katadromon).

Roles include airborne operations, unconventional warfare, reconnaissance, and guerrilla warfare.

All members of the Brigade wear the unit insignia depicting a winged sword, representative of the "deadly, silent and swift" nature of special forces operations. A scroll runs across the sword and wings with the motto "Who Dares Wins" (Greek: Ο Τολμων Νικα - O Tolmon Nika), a tribute to the Free Greek Special Forces that served with the 1st Special Air Service (1 SAS) Brigade during World War II. The unit flash is emblazoned with Δυνάμεις Καταδρομών (Raider Forces). While on operation, low-visibility patches are worn.

All Raiders wear the green beret with the Greek national emblem on the left.

=== Navy ===
The Naval command is the sea branch of the Cypriot National Guard, with its main base located at the "Evangelos Florakis" Naval Base - located in the southern coast near Mari and the Vasiliko Power Station. This medium sized base houses most of the naval command's ships as well as the central headquarters where vessels are refueled, repaired and managed.

Under the navy is an Elite Special Forces unit called "ΜYK" (Greek: Μονάδα Υποβρυχίων Καταστροφών) specializing in Underwater Demolition, Infiltration from the sea, Special Reconnaissance of coastal targets and combating events of terrorism/ incursion occurring in the EEZ of Cyprus. Their mission and operation is kept extremely secretive and little is known about the unit. The Unit has co-trained with similar partners across the world including the United States Navy Seals.

One other branch of the navy is the land based Exocet Anti-Ship batteries that are the primary long range weapon of Naval Command. The Cypriot Naval command possesses a publicly unknown amount of Exocet systems but recent information has emerged on them being heavily upgraded the Block III standard with brand new launcher vehicles

The Cypriot National Guard also possess a network of multiple Coastal Radars designed to protect and provide Early Warning to the naval forces. They are primarily used and were installed in order to be able to detect small migrant boats - leading to the Cypriot Naval Deployment during the Lebanese migration crisis.

And finally the Cypriot Naval command has its surface fleet, led by the flagship Commodore Andreas Ioannides & Alasia.

== Gallery ==
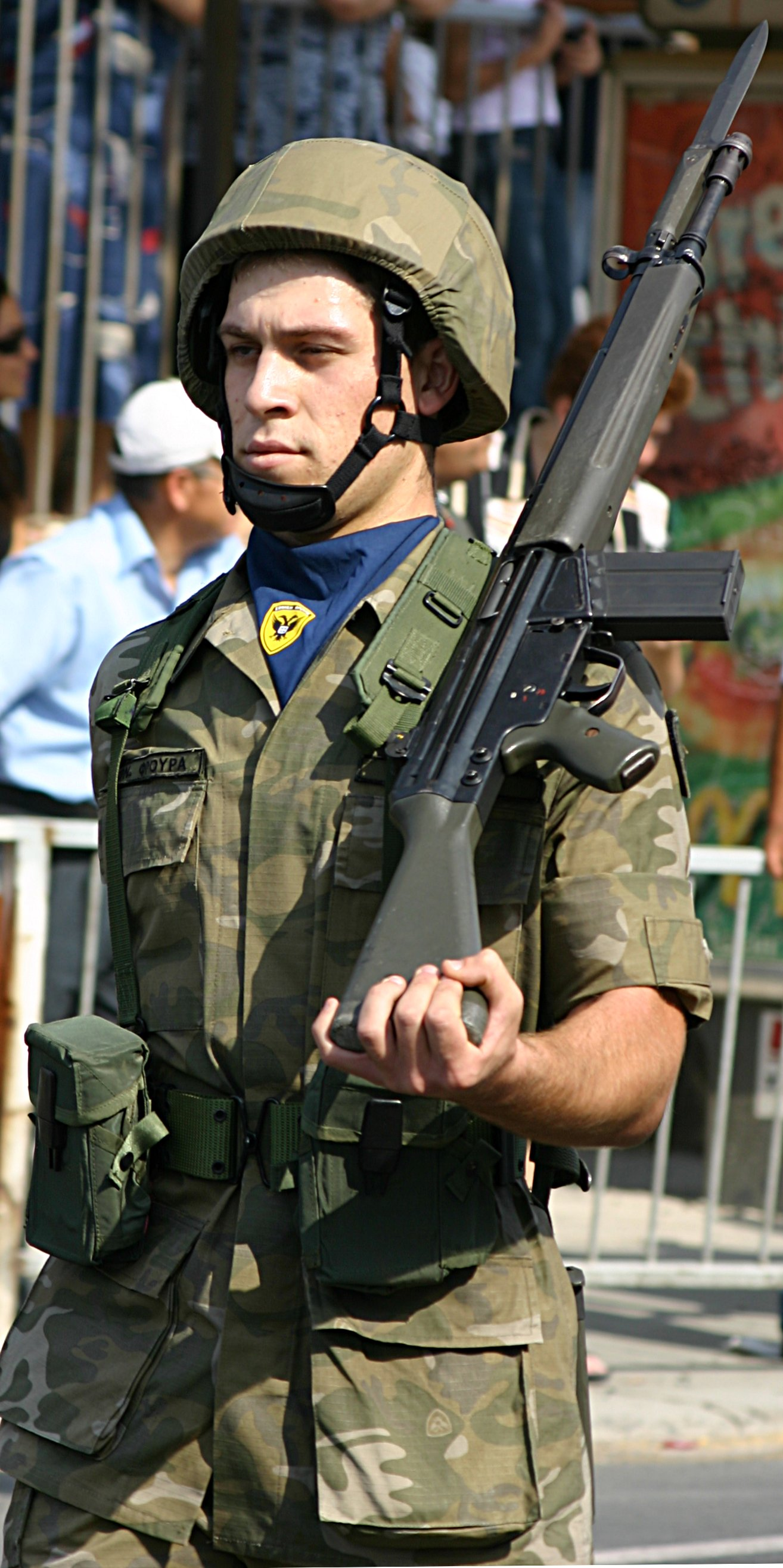
National Guard soldier with the G3A3 rifle (Cypriot National Guard Camouflage).

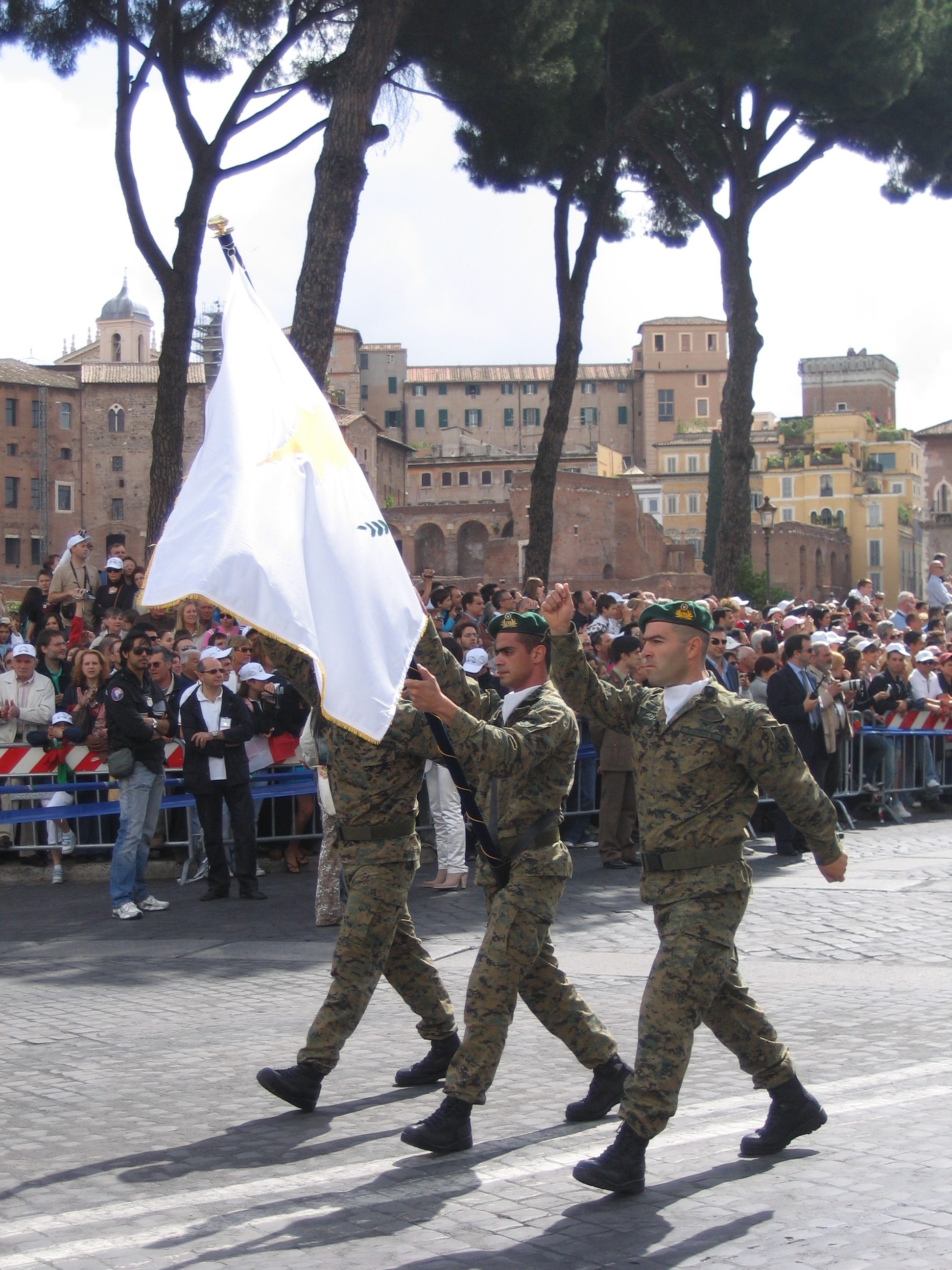
LOK officers marching at Republic Fest Military Parade in Italy, 2007.

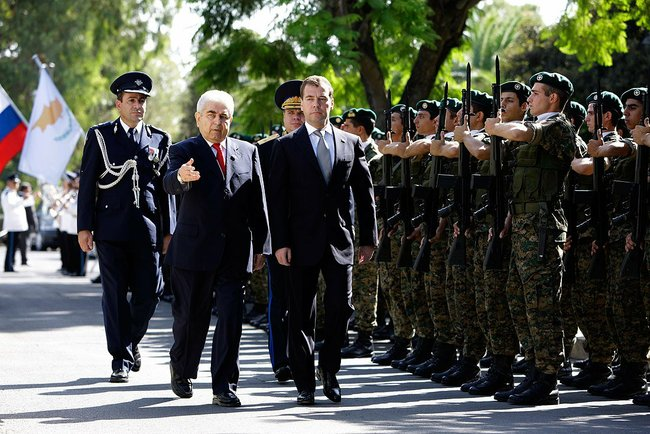
LOK raiders at a welcoming ceremony of Dmitry Medvedev.

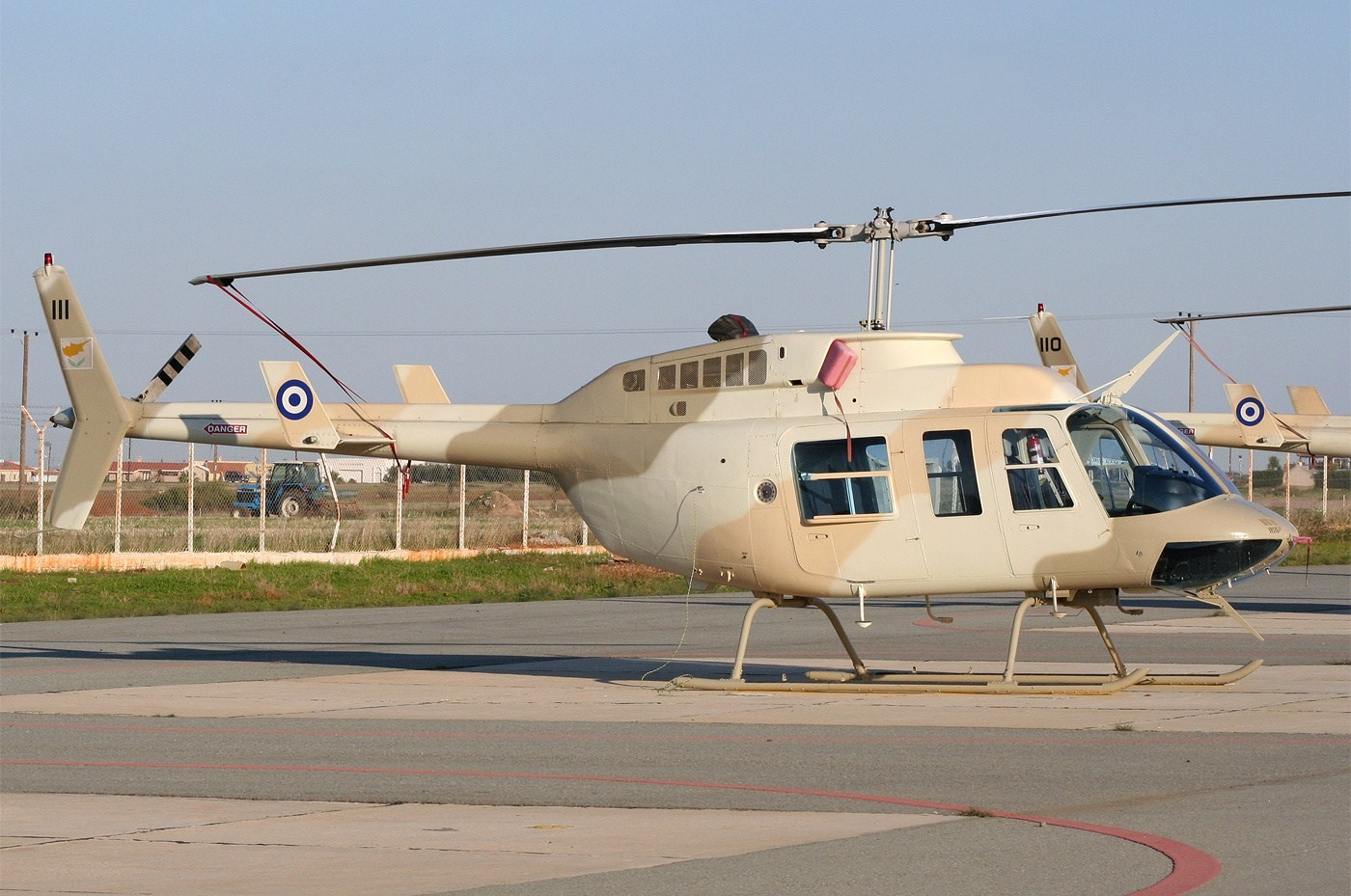
Bell-206L3 of Cypriot Air Force

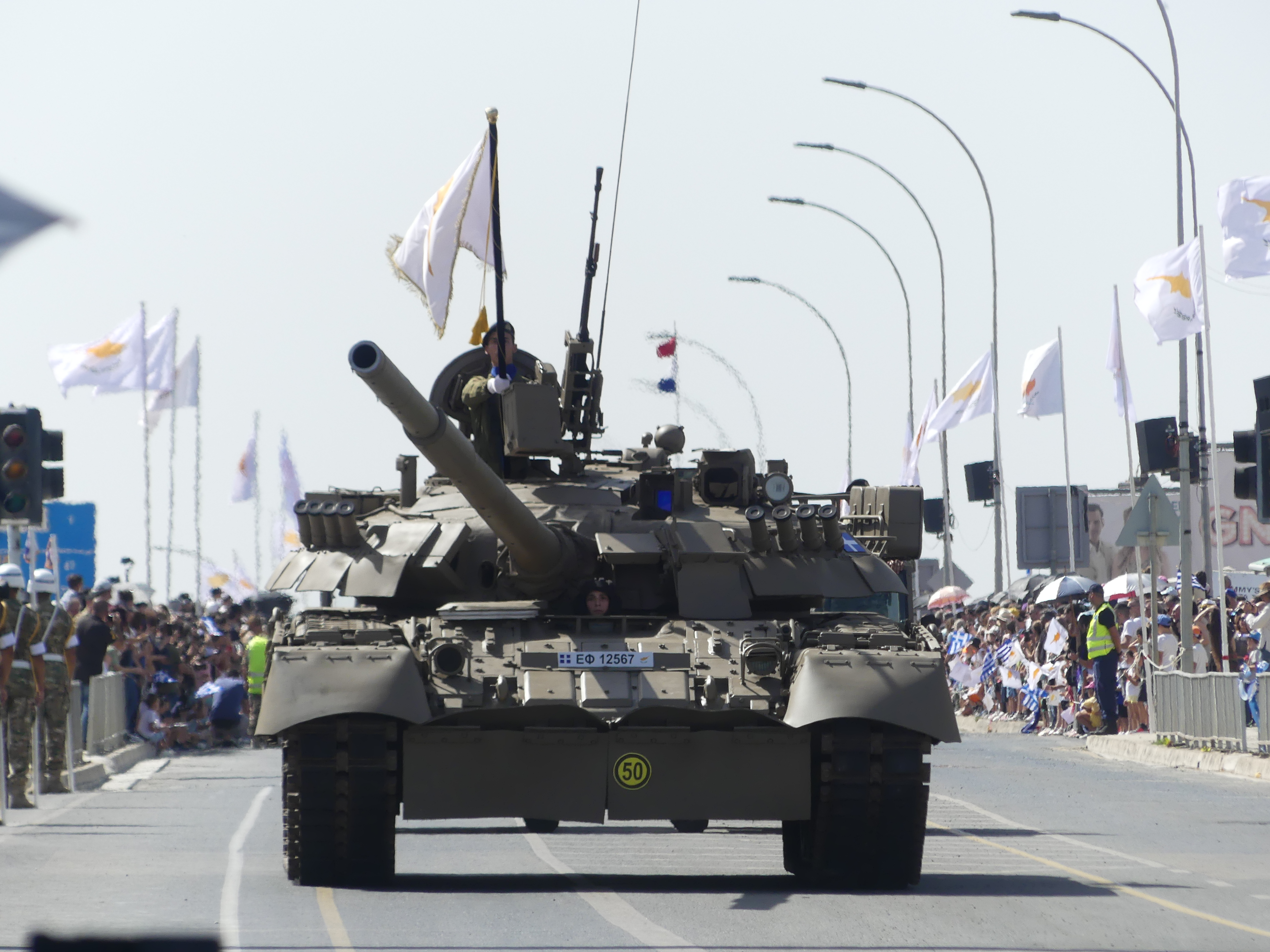
Cypriot T-80U Main Battle Tank οn the 1st of October Parade.

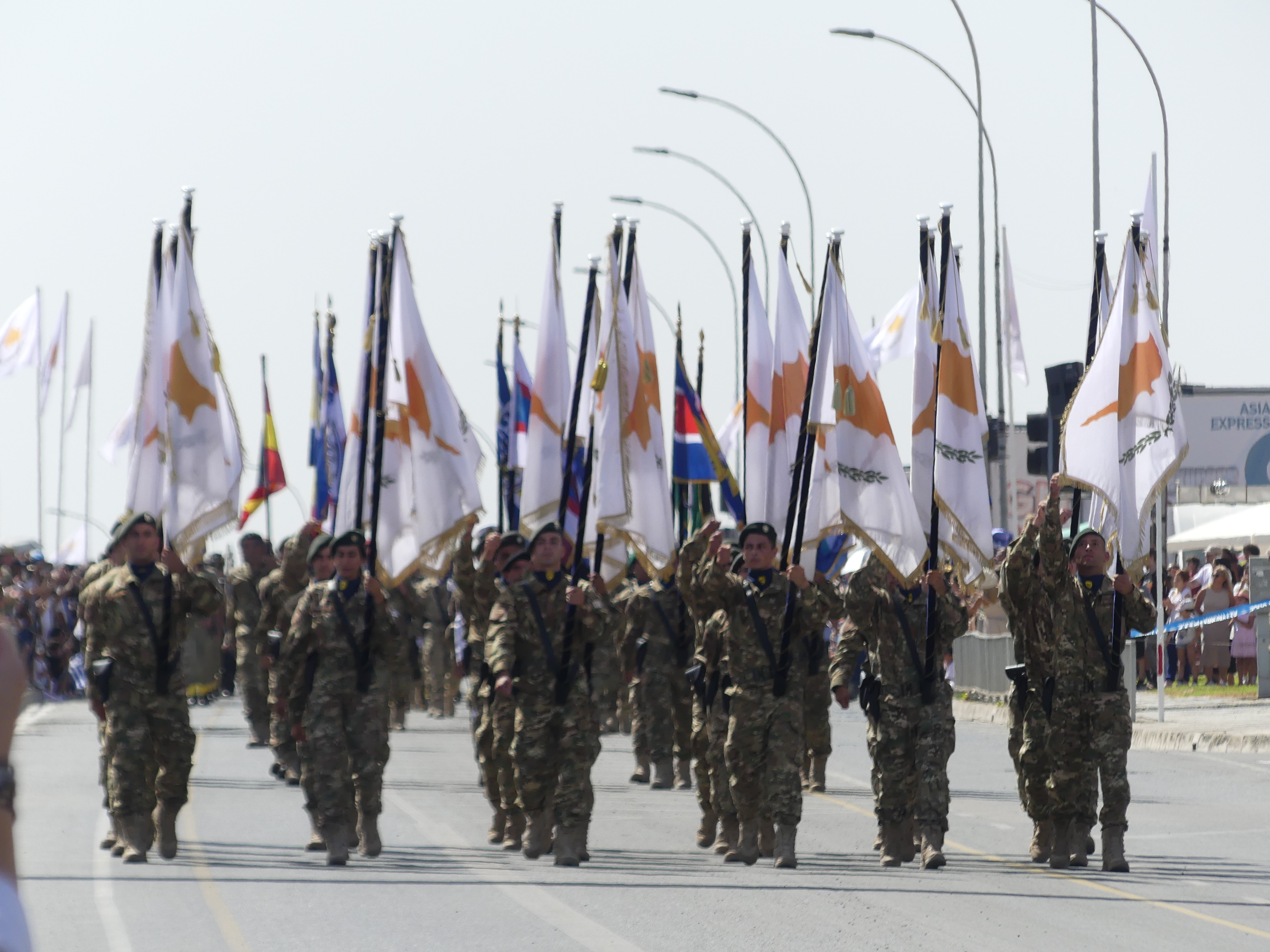
Flag Carriers of the Cypriot National Guard marching in formation during the Independence day parade.

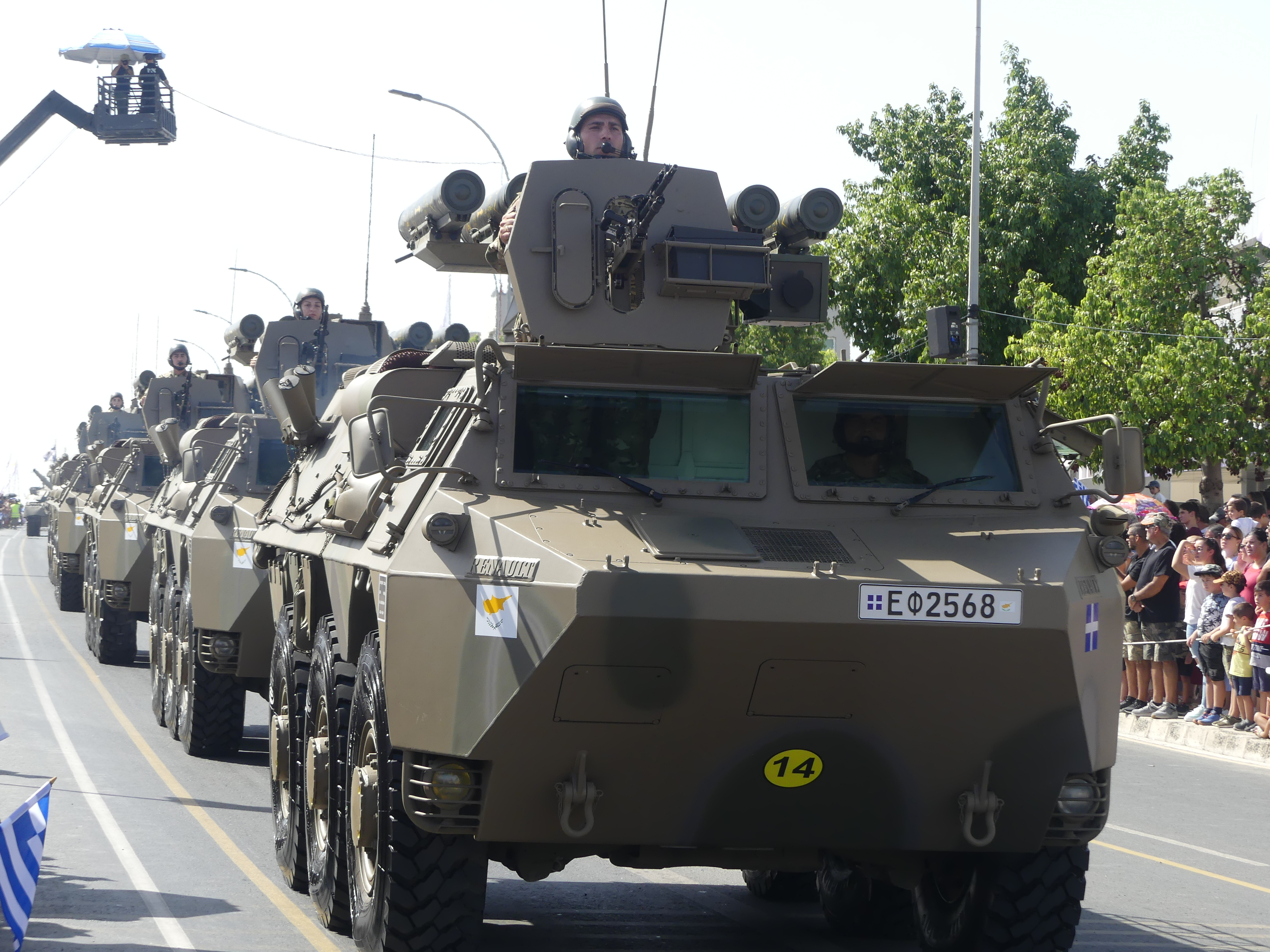
Cypriot VAB in a parade, this variant equipped with HOT-2 missiles (4)

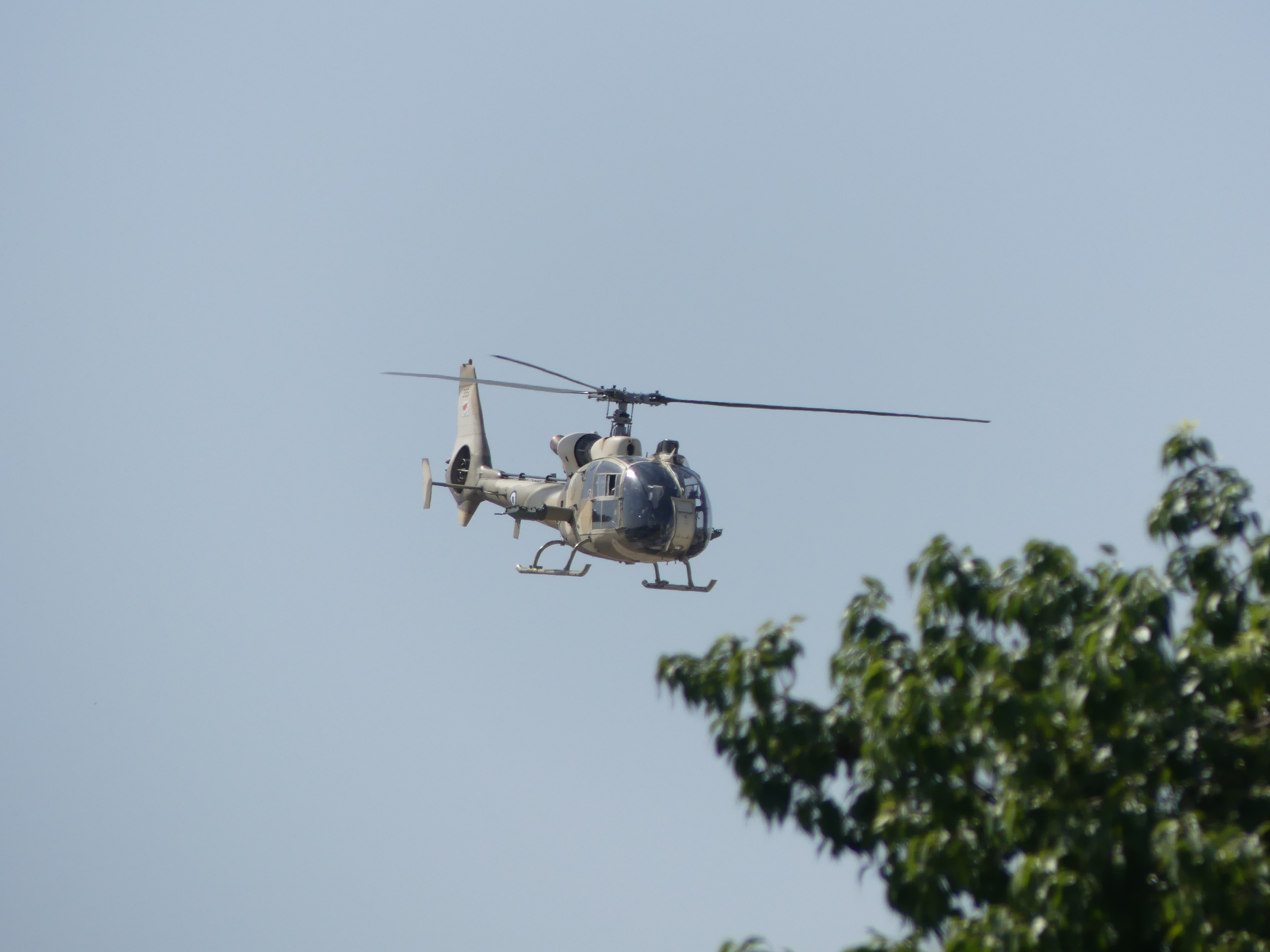
An Aérospatiale Gazelle flying above the crowd.

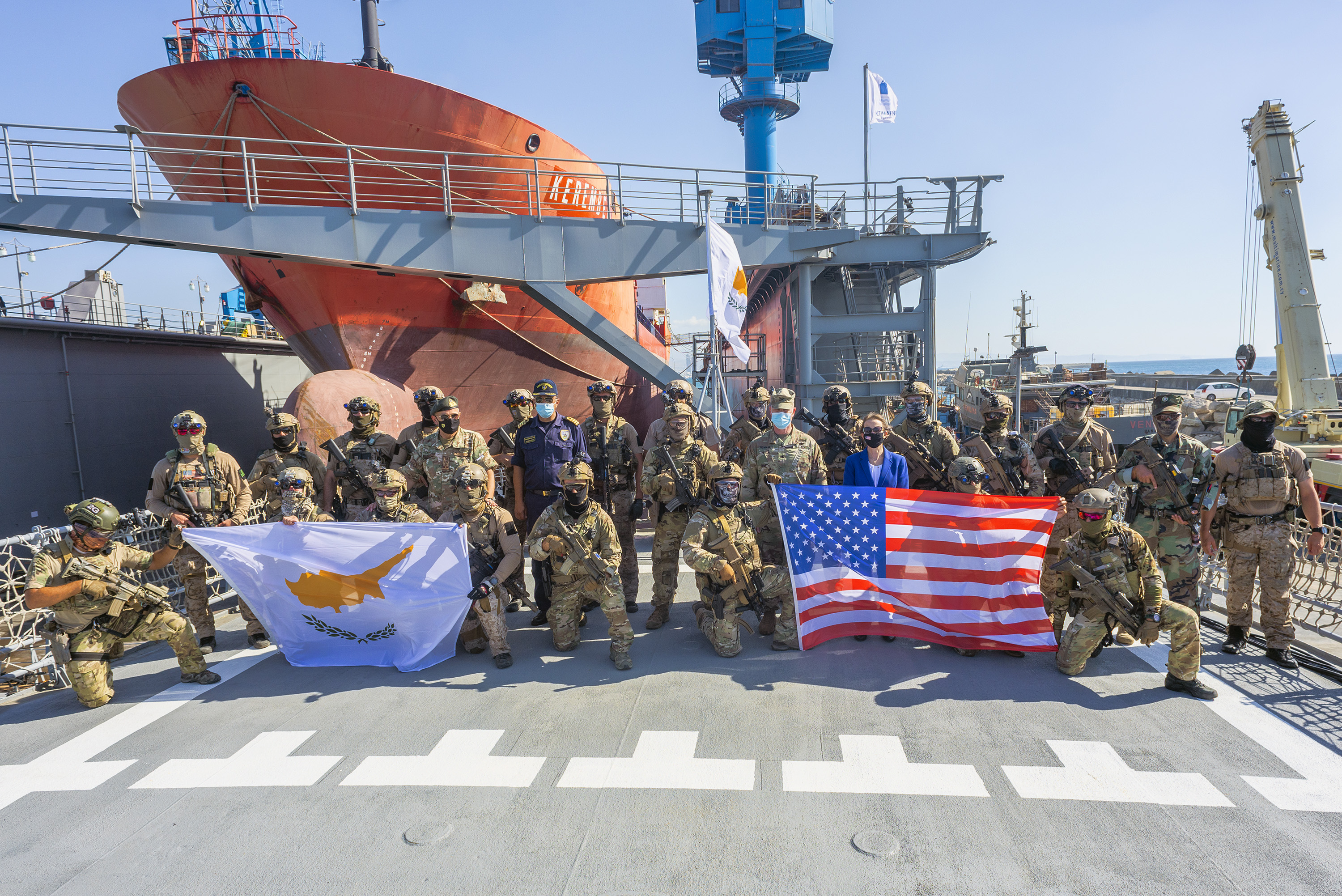
Soldiers of the Cypriot Special Forces and US Navy SEALs after a military exercise.

== See also ==
- Armoured vehicles of the Cypriot National Guard
- Battle of Pentemili beachhead (1974)
- Battle of Tylliria (Cyprus 1964)
- British Forces Cyprus
- Cyprus Air Forces
- Cyprus Civil Defence
- Cyprus Joint Rescue Coordination Center
- Cyprus Police
  - Cyprus Port & Marine Police
- List of equipment of the Cypriot National Guard
- List of ministers of defence of Cyprus
- Military operations during the Turkish invasion of Cyprus
- Reported Military Losses during the Invasion of Cyprus (1974)
- Turkish Cypriot Security Force
- Cyprus Turkish Peace Force Command
