= Cyprus Naval Command =

Maritime warfare branch of Cyprus' military

Naval Command of Cyprus
- Διοίκηση Ναυτικού Κύπρου (Greek); Kıbrıs Deniz Kuvvetleri (Turkish)
- Cyprus Naval Command's emblem
- Founded: July 1964
- Country: Cyprus
- Branch: Navy
- Size: 462 personnel (2014) 10 warships: 6 patrol boats 2 attack craft 2 speedboats
- Part of: Cypriot National Guard
- Engagements: Battle of Tylliria; Turkish invasion of Cyprus; 2024 Lebanon Migration crisis

Commanders
- Current commander: Commodore Nicolaos Luca
- Notable commanders: Lieutenant Eleftherios Tsomakis; Commodore Andreas Ioannidis

Insignia
- Ensign

- Jack

The Cyprus Naval Command (Greek: Διοίκηση Ναυτικού Κύπρου, romanized: Dioikisi Nautikou Kyprou, Turkish: Kıbrıs Deniz Kuvvetleri) (also known as the Cyprus Navy or Cypriot Navy) is the armed sea wing of the Cyprus National Guard. The Cypriot Navy has the primary mission of defending the maritime borders of the Republic of Cyprus, but is currently unable to access the waters around Northern Cyprus, which have been controlled by the Turkish Navy since the 1974 Turkish invasion of Cyprus. This force does not possess any capital ships or other major warships, but is equipped with patrol boats, landing craft, surface-to-surface missile systems and integrated radar systems, as well as SEALs-type naval underwater demolitions units.

== History ==
=== Combat actions of 1964 ===
On 6 August 1964, Cyprus National Guard forces commenced combat action against the Turkish Cypriot enclave of Kokkina, in the north-west of Cyprus. This operation was regarded by both Cyprus and Greece as a necessary interdiction against a threat by Turkish Cypriot militia, who were using Kokkina as a beachhead by which to land supplies and weapons shipped from Turkey. The Cyprus National Guard forces were under the command of General George Grivas, with the blessing of Athens. A combined land and sea attack was launched against Kokkina using two Cyprus Navy R-151 Group patrol boats, the Phaethon (commander - Second Leuthenant Dimitrios Mitsatsos) and the Arion, manned by Greek navy personnel. Firing 40mm and 20mm shells, the two patrol boats bombarded the enclave for a period of time, in conjunction with land-based 25-pounder artillery.

The battle was well underway on 8 August, when the Turkish Air Force commenced its own attack with fighter aircraft, making numerous strafing passes of Greek Cypriot positions. The vessel Phaethon was struck by rocket fire and burst into flames, forcing the crew to deliberately run it aground near Xeros Harbour. Seven of the crewmembers on Phaethon were killed and several wounded in the attack, and the ship was unsalvageable and later stricken.

The second R-151 Group patrol boat, Arion, was attacked by the same Turkish fighter jet formations, and was reportedly struck several times by strafing fire, but escaped to Paphos. During the attack on the Arion, a Turkish F-100 Super Sabre, piloted by Captain Cengiz Topel, was struck by 40mm anti-aircraft fire and shot down. The pilot ejected over land but was captured and later died in custody due to unknown causes. Greek Cypriot authorities claimed that Topel had been injured and died of wounds after being treated in hospital, but Turkish authorities claim he was tortured to death.

=== Naval organization in 1970 ===
MTBs flotilla:

- First squadron; base - Boghazi; boats: T-4, T-5, T-6
- Second squadron; base - Kyrenia; boats: T-1, T-2, T-3
- Patrol Boats squadron; base - Boghazi; boats: Leventis, Dedalos
- Four radar stations (range of detection 45 nautical miles)
- Naval stations at Famagusta, Xylophagos, Limassol, Paphos
- Underwater Demolitions Unit (Boghazi naval base)

=== Cypriot naval vessels from 1964 to 1974 ===
Country of origin	Vessel type	Class	Name	Pennant	Fate
West Germany	Group Motor Minesweeper (R boat)	R-151	Arion (Leventis after 1965)	P1 (1964) 15 (1972)	Sunk 14 August 1974 by own crew at Naval Base "Chrysulis"
West Germany	Group Motor Minesweeper (R boat)	R-151	Phaethon	P2 (1964)	Sunk 8 August 1964 near Xeros in a battle with Turkish airplanes.
West Germany	Group Motor Minesweeper (R boat)	R-218	Dedalos	Unknown	Removed from Navy lists in 1970 and 1971
Soviet Union	Motor torpedo boat	P-4 Skinhead (Type 123K)	T-1 (Adopted Oct 1964)	20 (1965)	Sunk 20 July 1974 North-East of Kyrenia in a battle with Turkish invasion forces.
Soviet Union	Motor torpedo boat	P-4 Skinhead (Type 123K)	T-2 (Adopted Oct 1964)	21 (1965)	Run aground 21 July 1974 North of Naval Base "Chrysulis". Later captured by Turkish forces.
Soviet Union	Motor torpedo boat	P-4 Skinhead (Type 123K)	T-3 (Adopted Oct 1964)	22 (1965)	Sunk 20 July 1974 North-East of Kyrenia in a battle with Turkish invasion forces.
Soviet Union	Motor torpedo boat	P-4 Skinhead (Type 123K)	T-4 (adopted October 1964)	23 (1965)	Sunk 14 August 1974 by own crew at Naval Base "Chrysulis"
Soviet Union	Motor torpedo boat	P-4 Skinhead (Type 123K)	T-5 (Adopted Feb 1965)	24 (1965)	In 1973-74 removed from active service and disarmed. Destroyed 14 August 1974 at Naval Base "Chrysulis"
Soviet Union	Motor torpedo boat	P-4 Skinhead (Type 123K)	T-6 (Adopted Feb 1965)	25 (1965)	Sunk 14 August 1974 by own crew at Naval Base "Chrysulis"
France	Fast Patrol Craft (PCF)	Esterel (Kelefstis Stamou)	Kelefstis Stamou (Embargoed, purchased by the Hellenic Navy)	P28 (1975) P287 (since 1980)	Still active
France	Fast Patrol Craft (PCF)	Esterel (Kelefstis Stamou)	Diopos Antoniou (Embargoed, purchased by the Hellenic Navy)	P29 (1975) P286 (since 1980)	Still active
Yugoslavia	Motor torpedo boat	Type 108	Unknown (replaced T-5 by 1974)	Unknown	Probably sunk 14 August 1974 by own crew at Naval Base "Chrysulis"
Yugoslavia	Motor torpedo boat	Type 108	Unknown (unconfirmed status)	Unknown	Unknown
Yugoslavia	Motor torpedo boat	Type 108	Unknown (unconfirmed status)	Unknown	Unknown

Main armament

- Sweden 40 mm Bofors Mark III L60 gun
- Switzerland 20 mm Oerlikon Mark 10 L70 cannon
- Soviet Union 14,5 mm 2M-5 machine guns
- Soviet Union 450 mm type 45-52 torpedoes
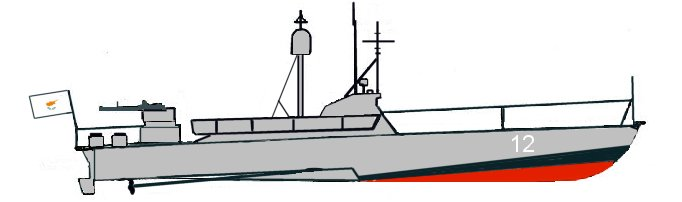
Cyprus Navy P-4 "Skinhead" class Motor Torpedo Boat

=== Combat actions of 1974 ===
On 15 July 1974, EOKA-B and elements of the Cyprus National Guard overthrew the legitimate President, Archbishop Makarios and replaced him with Nikos Sampson. Makarios escaped an initial attempt to capture him at the Archbishiporic in Nicosia, and fled to Paphos. A naval patrol vessel, Leventis (pennant number 15) was quickly dispatched to Paphos to begin shelling a radio station there which was being operated by pro-Makarios elements.

On 20 July 1974, Turkey invaded Cyprus in a surprise-attack, without issuing a declaration of war. A naval force of Turkish vessels was detected by coastal radar at Apostolos Andreas approaching the coast, and a second force of naval vessels was sighted off the coast of Kyrenia during the early hours. The Cyprus National Guard Naval Command quickly ordered its two motor torpedo boats, T-1 (commander - Lieutenant Junior Grade Nicolaos Verikios) and T-3 (commander - Lieutenant Elefterios Tsomakis), (based at Kyrenia) to attack the Turkish flotilla directly. Both vessels were promptly sunk by combined air and sea attack. The rest of the Cyprus Navy vessels were sunk by their own crews at Naval base "Chrysulis" in Boghazi (14 August 1974). After the conflict, two boats were refloated by Turkish troops and transferred to Golcuk Naval Museum, Turkey (on display with pennant numbers 11 and 12).

=== Developments from 1975 to 2008 ===
In 1983, the Navy acquired a single Type 32L Esterel fast patrol craft from France. The vessel has been upgraded, and has heavy armament, including two 2-round Mistral-SIMBAD air-defence missile launchers, 1 40mm .70cal OTO-Breda-Bofors AA cannon and 1 20mm .90cal Rheinmetall AA cannon. Later (circa 2006-2008) 40mm .70cal OTO-Breda-Bofors AA cannon was replaced by 20mm .70cal Oerlikon Mk10 AA cannon.

In 1994, Cyprus acquired 24 Aerospatiale MM40 Exocet Block-II anti-ship missiles (reportedly initially intended for Iran) from France, along with 3 coastal defence batteries.

In 2000, the Cyprus Navy received the ex-Hellenic Navy patrol boat "Knossos", which was renamed "Kyrenia", designated P02 and formed the Kyrenia class. This vessel was Greek made, of the Dilos-class, previously designated P269. This vessel is armed with one single 20mm .70cal Oerlikon Mk10 AA cannon and one 2-round Mistral-SIMBAD air-defence missile launcher.

In 2002, the Cyprus Navy acquired two Rodman 55 fast assault boats for the purpose of serving her Special Forces units. These fast craft are named "Agathos" and "Panagos".

During 2004-2006, Cyprus took delivery of four FPB 30M type fast patrol craft from manufacturer Cantierre Navale Vittoria of Italy, of which two were intended for the Navy, and two intended for the Marine Police. These vessels were fitted with single 25mm .80cal KBA OTO-Melara automatic cannons and two single 12.7mm machine guns, equipped with radars and Forward Looking Infra-Red (FLIRs). The Navy pair were issued the pennant numbers P03 and P04.

=== 2011 base disaster ===
On 11 July 2011, the Evangelos Florakis Naval Base explosion resulted in the destruction of much of the infrastructure of the nation's main naval port and loss of the Commander of Cypriot Navy Captain Andreas Ioannides. Reconstruction began immediately on the strength of domestic contracts for buildings and structures.

=== Acquisition of new warships ===
Following various media reports in 2012 that Cyprus was entertaining offers by Israel and Greece to supply two heavy Offshore Patrol Vessels (OPVs), being far larger and more capable than anything previously operated, it was extensively reported in January 2013 that Cyprus signed an agreement with France to purchase two large, stealthy and well-armed vessels based upon the GOWIND corvette design. This frenzy of media speculation was bolstered by the otherwise sudden and unexplained visit to Cyprus by the L'Adroit, which some sources interpreted as a demonstration of the ship design, to be held at Limassol port from 24 to 26 January 2013. Further unconfirmed reports by the Cyprus media claim to have it on good authority that a US$120 million down payment for the vessels is factored into the 2013 fiscal budget, justified against the 2012–2013 Cypriot financial crisis by emergency defense requirements.

On 14 February 2017 a vessel was presented to Cyprus as a gift from the Sultanate of Oman. It was part of the Royal Omani Navy fleet, but was decommissioned and refitted for use in the waters off Cyprus. The ship was renamed Alasia.

On 15 January 2018 the Cyprus Navy commissioned the Commodore Andreas Ioannides P 61, the ship was built by Israel Shipyards Limited and is based on the Saar 4.5 FAC. The navy has an option for an additional vessel which was exercised as of December 2018.

=== 2024 Lebanon Migrant crisis ===
As a result of the Lebanese government's inability to deal with the migrant crisis, It was decided by the Cypriot government to send Port and Marine Police and Navy ships to patrol approximately 30 nautical miles off the Lebanese coast in order to prevent illegal immigration into the country.

==== Turkish Navy incident ====
During the patrol off the coast of Lebanon, a Turkish Navy ship was spotted by Cypriot coastal radars approaching the two ships that were on patrol in the area and as such, the command center from one of the ships immediately alerted the government in Nicosia, which got into contact with Athens who immediately sent the frigate Spetsai to support the Cypriot ships. The Turkish ship later left the area with the Cypriot General Staff and rest of the government were fully informed of all the Turkish military movements that were taking place until it left.

== Designation ==
On 2 March 2026, Iran’s government declared the air force and navy of Cyprus as “terrorist organisations” in retaliation after the European Union officially labelled Iran’s Islamic Revolutionary Guard Corps (IRGC) a terrorist organisation. Tehran described the EU move as illegal and said its designation was a reciprocal response under Iranian law to what it called a violation of international legal principles.

== Structure ==
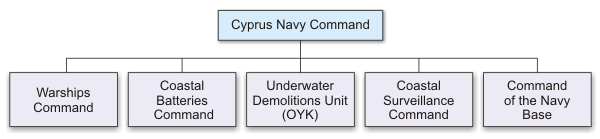

== Equipment ==
=== Vessels ===
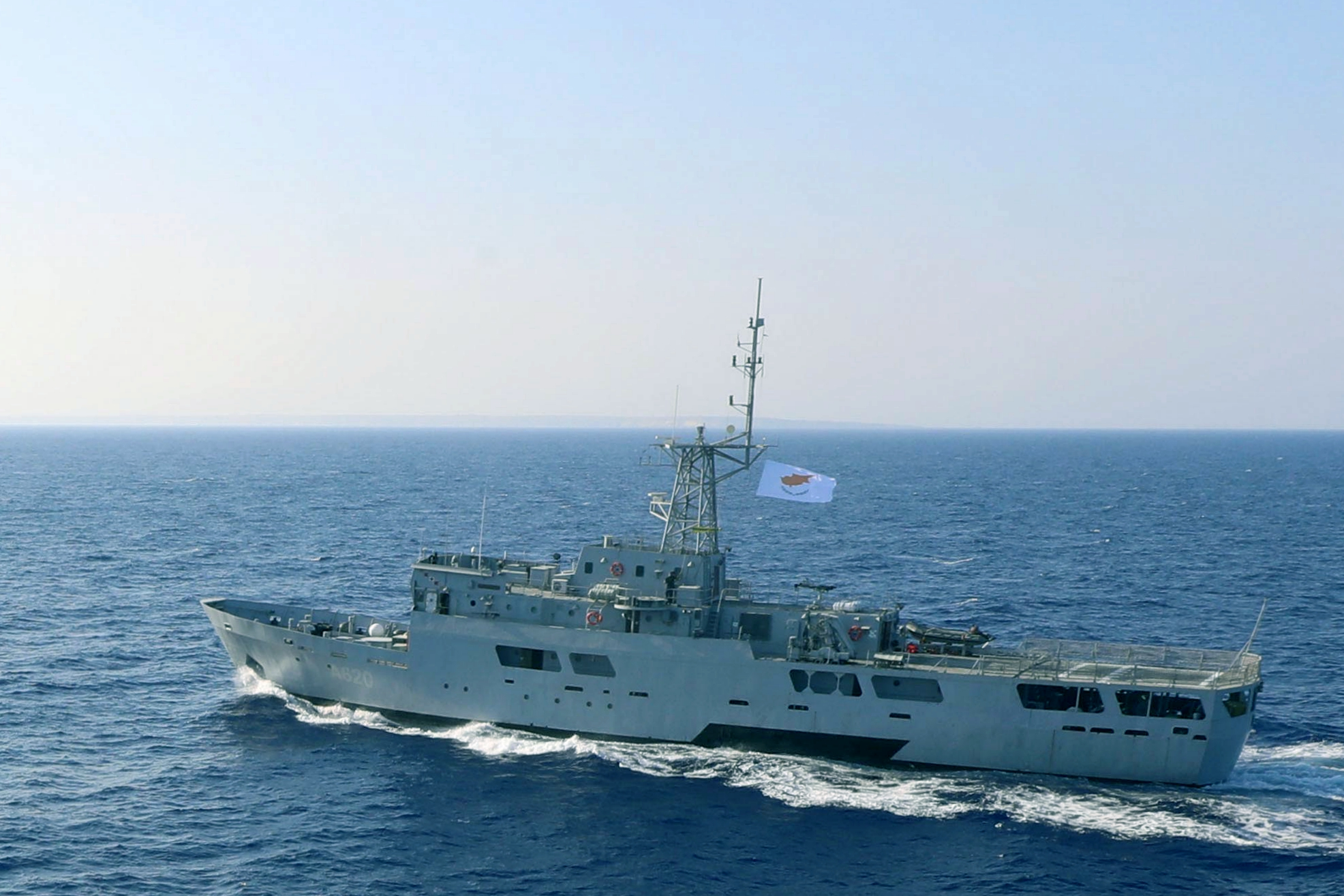
Alasia (A620)

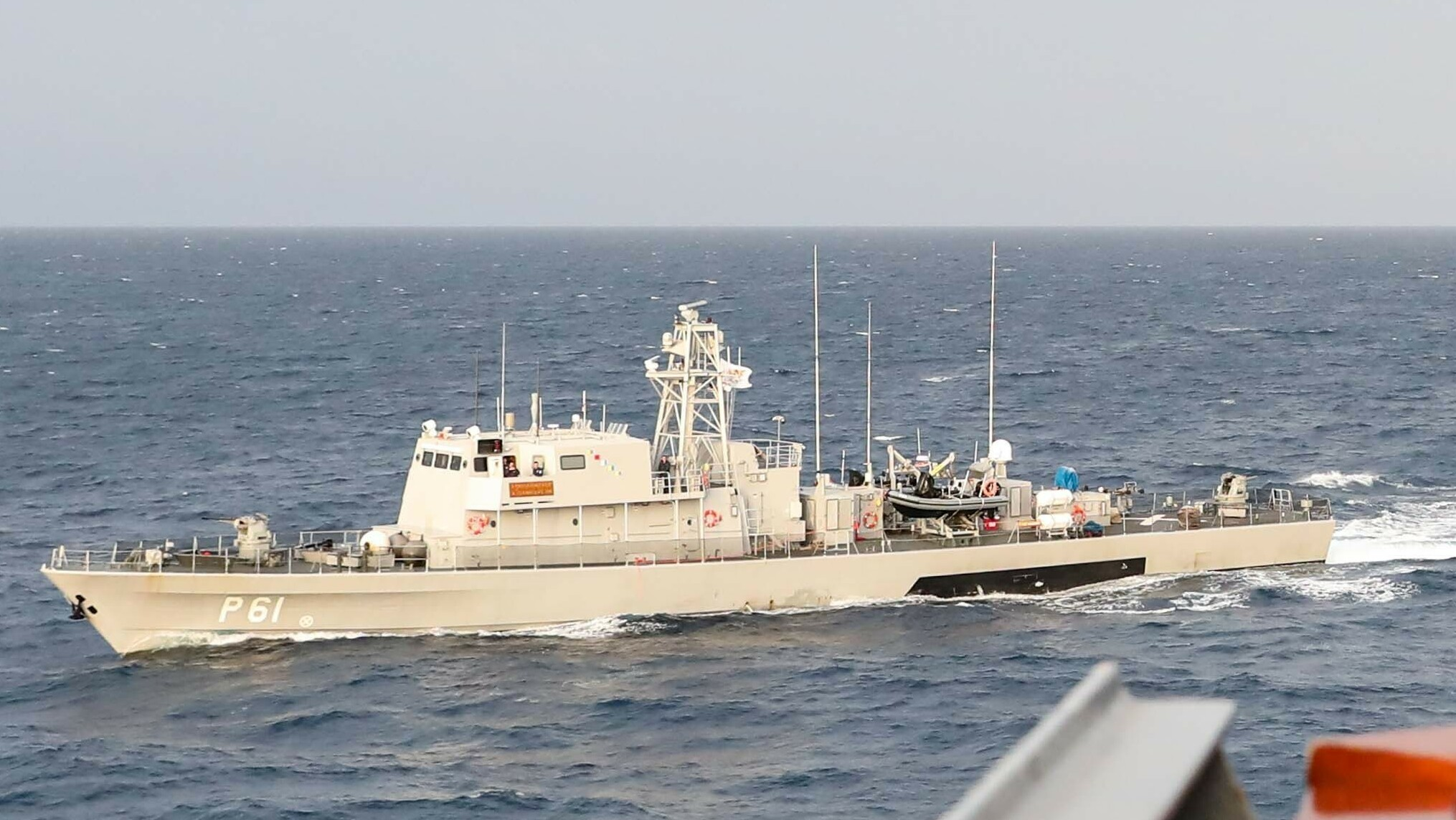
Commodore Andreas Ioannides (P61)

Class	Ship	No.	Country of origin	Vessel type	Length
Al Mubrukah	Alasia	A620	United Kingdom	Offshore patrol vessel (OPV)	62 m (203 ft)
Saar 62	Commodore Andreas Ioannides	P61	Israel	Offshore patrol vessel (OPV)	62 m (203 ft)
Saar 62	On order, delivery to be confirmed	TBD	Israel	Offshore patrol vessel (OPV)	62 m (203 ft)
Esterel	Salamis	P01	France	Fast Patrol Boat (FPB)	32 m (105 ft)
FPB	Lieutenant Eleftherios Tsomakis	P03	Italy	Fast Patrol Boat (FPB)	27 m (89 ft)
FPB	Lieutenant Commander Nikolas Georgiou	P04	Italy	Fast Patrol Boat (FPB)	27 m (89 ft)
FPB	Ammochostos	P05	Finland	Fast Patrol Boat (FPB)	25 m (82 ft)
Rodman 55	Agathos	N/A	Spain	Fast Attack Craft (FAC)	17 m (56 ft)
Rodman 55	Panagos	N/A	Spain	Fast Attack Craft (FAC)	17 m (56 ft)
Rafnar 40		N/A	Greece		

Also 2 Italian-made speedboats Poseidonas 1 and Nireas 1.

Main naval base - Evangelos Florakis, Mari - Larnaca

Naval stations - Limassol, Pafos

== Naval commanders ==
- September 2000 – 10 July 2002: Captain Nicholas Georgiou (killed in air accident)
- July 2002 – 20 August 2008: Captain Evangelos Valvis
- 20 August 2008 – 11 July 2011: Captain Andreas Ioannides (killed in naval base disaster)
- 11 July 2011 – 5 November 2011: Captain George Pitsiakos
- 5 November 2011: Captain Kyriakos Pochanis
- 2019 –: Rear Admiral Charalambos Charalambous

== See also ==
- Cyprus Joint Rescue Coordination Center
- Cyprus Port & Marine Police
- Evangelos Florakis Naval Base
- List of equipment of the Cypriot National Guard
- Military operations during the Turkish invasion of Cyprus
