= Andreas Ioannides (naval officer) =

Cypriot naval officer

- Born: 6 June 1958; Rizokarpaso, British Cyprus
- Died: 11 July 2011 (aged 53)
- Military career
- Allegiance: Cyprus
- Branch: Cyprus Navy
- Units: Naval Command; Underwater Demolition Team

Andreas Ioannides (Greek: Ανδρέας Ιωαννίδης; 6 June 1958 – 11 July 2011) was the head of the Cyprus Navy until his death in the Evangelos Florakis Navy Base explosion, which took place at the Evangelos Florakis Navy Base on 11 July 2011.

His son, Nikolas Ioannides, is the current Deputy Minister of Migration and International Protection.

== Career ==
A Greek Cypriot, Ioannides was born in Rizokarpaso in 1958, entered the Hellenic Naval Academy in 1977 and graduated in 1981 as an Ensign. He then underwent additional training at various Greek special forces facilities and command and staff schools.

Ioannides served as an officer on board warships, as CO of the MM40 Exocet batteries, as head of the Staff and Operations Directorate of the Cyprus Naval Command, head of the Coastal Surveillance Command, head of the Warships Command and Deputy Commander of the Cyprus Naval Command, before being appointed as Commander of the Naval Command on 20 August 2008, taking over from Captain Panayotis Vougioulakis.

Military offices
Preceded by Panayotis Vougioulakis	Chief of the Cypriot Naval Staff; 2008 - 2011	Succeeded by George Pitsiakos
