= Underwater Demolition Team (Cyprus) =

Cyprus Navy's naval special warfare unit

Underwater Demolition Team (MYK)
- Μονάδα Υποβρυχίων Καταστροφών (ΜΥΚ)
- Active: 1964–present
- Country: Cyprus
- Branch: Cyprus Navy
- Type: Special Forces
- Role: Special Reconnaissance (SR); Direct Action (DA); Military assistance (MA); Combat search and rescue (CSAR); Maritime Operations
- Garrison/HQ: Larnaca, Cyprus
- Nicknames: Frogmen (Greek: Βατραχάνθρωποι); Frogs (Greek: Βατράχια); OYK (Greek: ΟΥΚ); Oykades (Greek: Οϋκάδες)
- Patron: Saint Nicholas
- Motto: ΡΩΜΗ ΜΕΤΑ ΦΡΟΝΗΣΕΩΣ
- Engagements: 2024 Lebanon Migration crisis

Commanders
- Notable commanders: Andreas Ioannides; Costas Fitiris

The Underwater Demolition Team (Greek: Μονάδα Υποβρυχίων Καταστροφών), abbreviated as MYK (Greek: ΜΥΚ,Greek pronunciation: [mik]) is the Cyprus Navy's special warfare unit.

== History ==
The Underwater Demolition Team was created in 1964, alongside the newly formed National Guard, with trainers from Greece carrying out the first underwater demolition school, only 18 graduates out of the 142 passing.

During the early hours of the invasion, OYK, at its then base in Bogazi, was placed on alert but took no further action during the invasion.

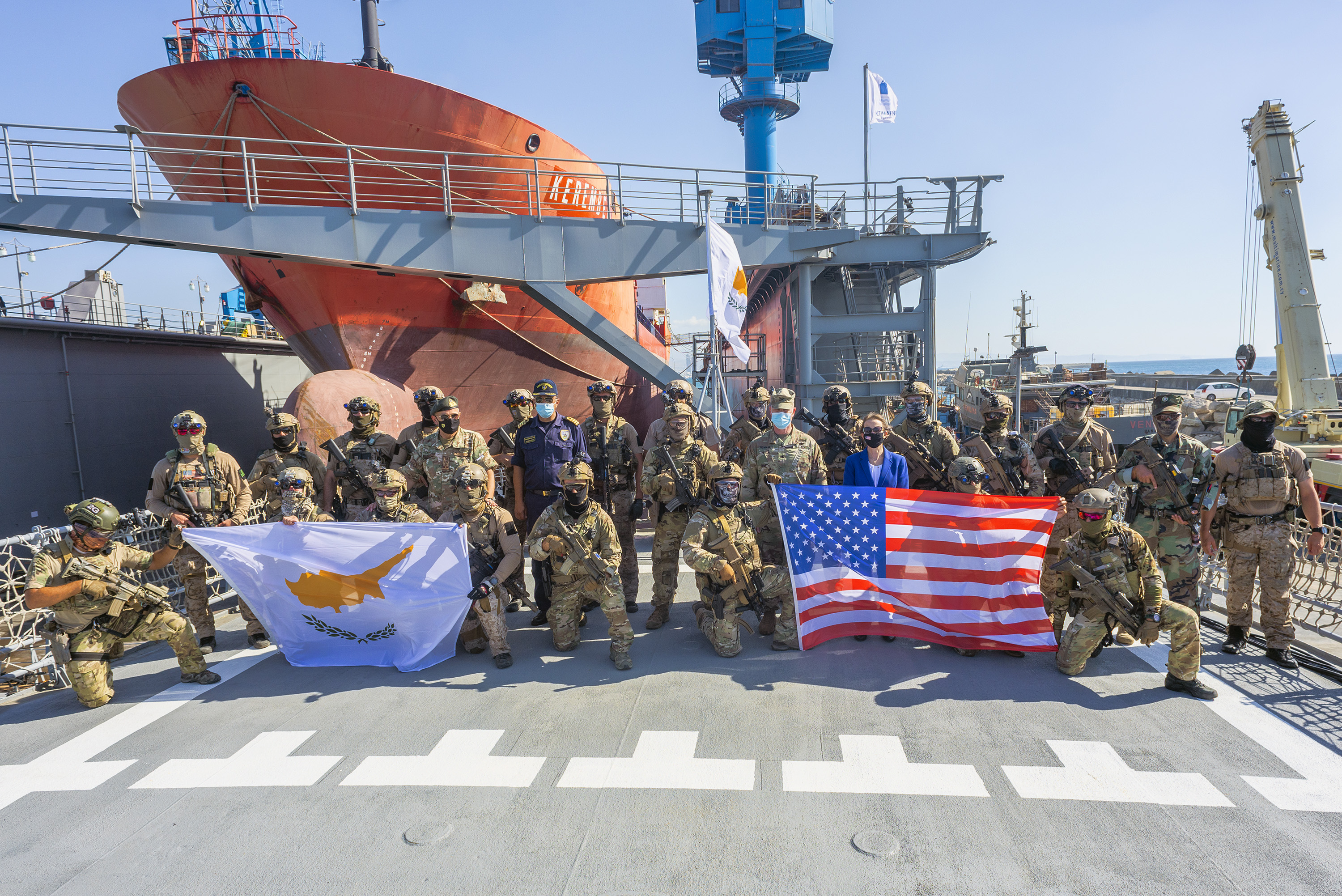
Cypriot SEALs and their US counterparts after a training exercise

== Training ==
MYK's training is similar to that of its Greek and American counterparts, with a school (BUD/S) lasting 6–8 months and candidates undergoing the necessary training before completion, including diving (open and closed circuit), demolitions and undergoing hell week.

== Equipment ==
MYK uses an array of weapons for the execution of different types of operations they may receive.

- FN SCAR (L & H TPR)
- IWI Tavor
- H&K MP5
- COLT M5
- M-16
- FN Minimi
- Accuracy International Arctic Warfare
- Accuracy International AX50
- Several sidearms

== Notable people ==
Many MYK operators have gained either positions within the government or have been involved in high-profile events, most important being Andreas Ioannides, who was a SEAL however serving as the commander of the Navy at the time of the Evangelos Florakis Naval Base explosion and subsequently losing his life.

Other notable people who have served in the unit are:

- Costas Fitiris – Former Commander of the Cyprus Joint Rescue Coordination Center and Chief Marina Officer of the Ayia Napa Marina; since December 2025 serving as Minister of Justice and Public Order of the Republic of Cyprus.
- Fidias Panayiotou – Currently serving as a Member of the European Parliament

== Gallery ==
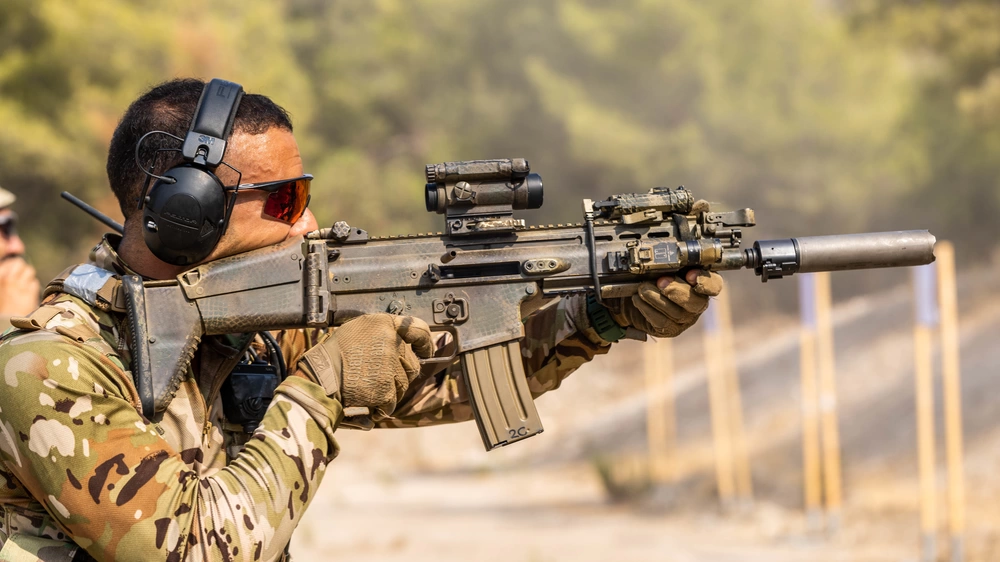
Cypriot MYK operator with his FN SCAR in a live fire exercise with US Navy SEALs

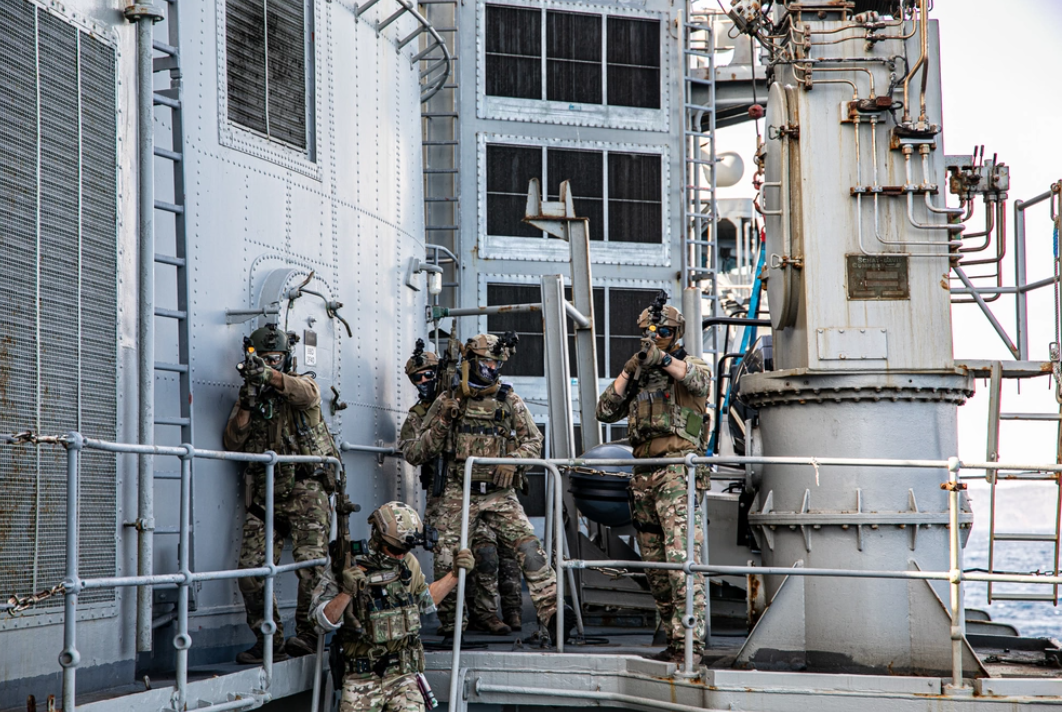
OYK operators from Cyprus and Greece during a VBSS exercise with the USA

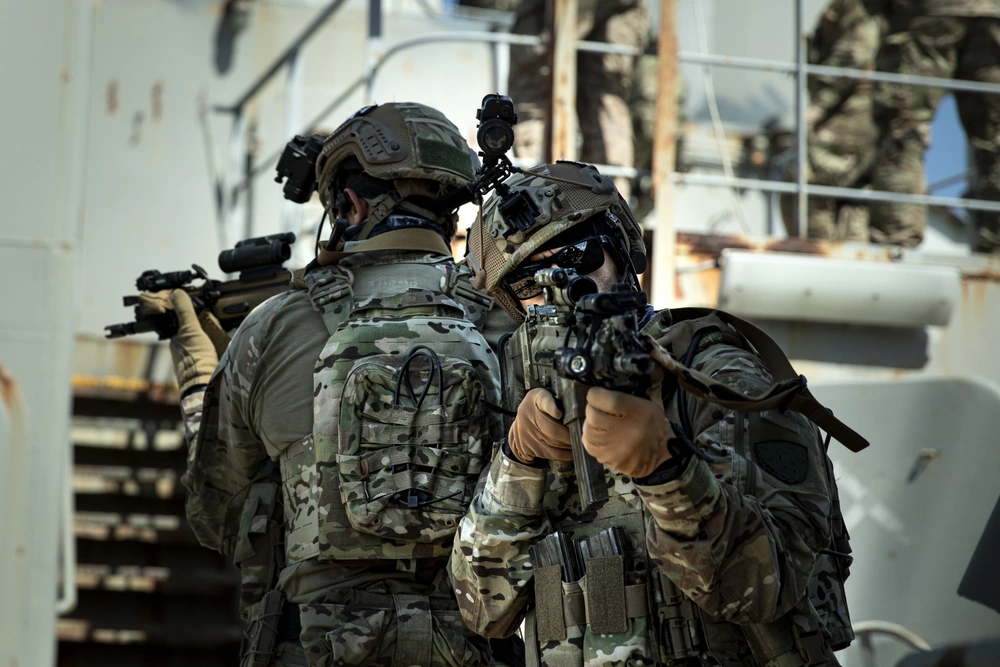
Cypriot Greek and Greek SEALs secure parts of a ship during a VBSS exercise

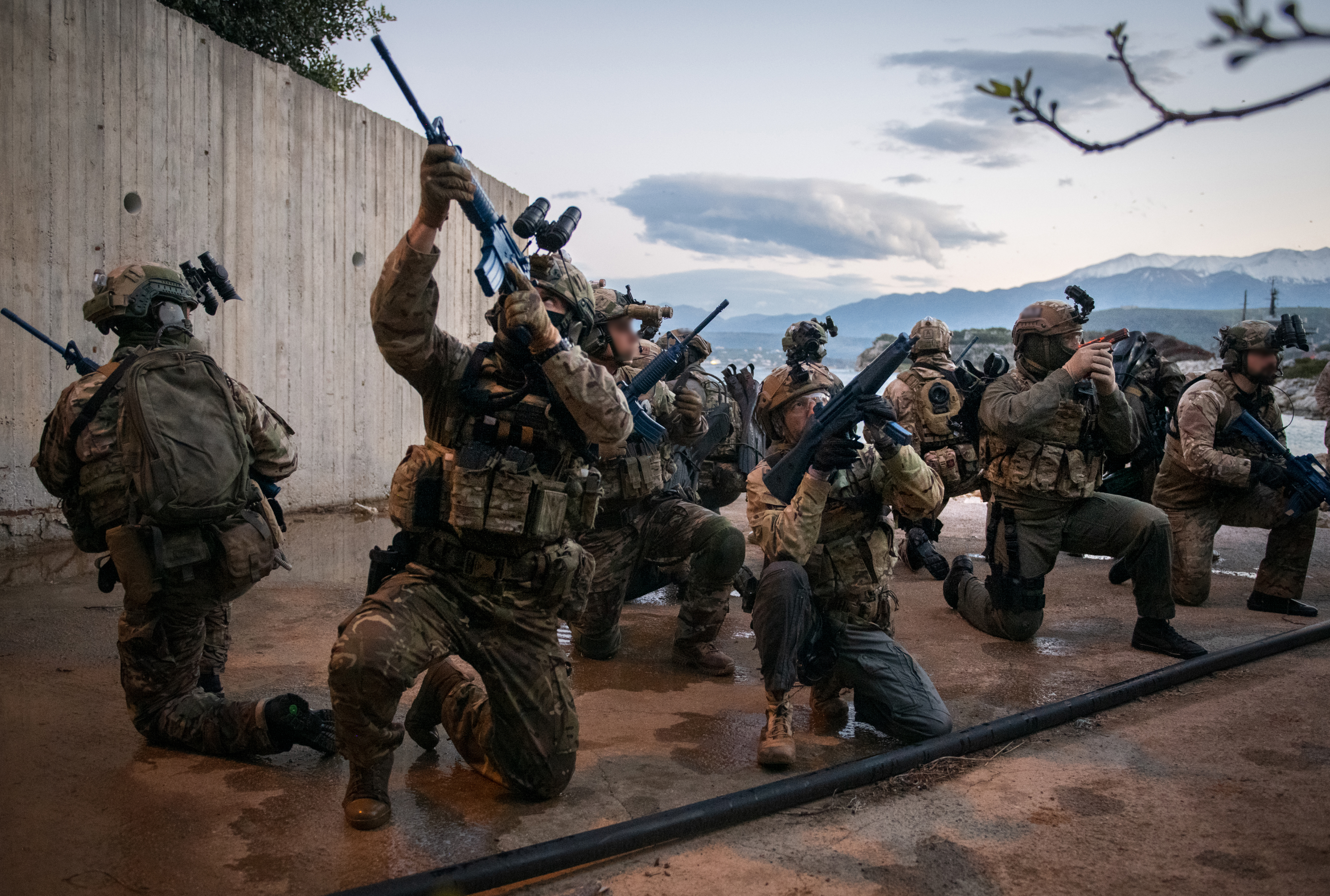
Naval Special Warfare Task Unit Europe (NSWTU-E), the Greek Underwater Demolition Team (DYK) and Cypriot Underwater Demolition Team (UDT), execute an Over the Beach (OTB) insertion exercise

== See also ==
- Underwater Demolition Command
- Special Forces Command
