= Phaethon (patrol boat) =

Phaethon (Greek: ακταιωρός "Φαέθων", named after the mythical hero Phaethon, the son of Helios) was a patrol boat of the Cypriot Navy which took part in the battle of Tillyria on 8 August 1964. It was under the command of Greek second lieutenant Dimitrios Mitsatsos and was crewed by the Greek Navy in a top-secret mission to help patrol the Cypriot coastline. The boat also fought against the Turkish Cypriot forces during the battle at Tillyria. The losses sustained by the crew were the first battle casualties of the Hellenic Navy after World War II. Due to the top-secret nature of the mission, the commander and crew of the boat, including the fallen, received recognition from Greece and Cyprus on 19 January 2016, more than 50 years after the battle.

== Historical background ==
In 1964, the government of Georgios Papandreou sent a Greek army division to Cyprus to help establish the Cypriot National Guard. As part of the same policy, two patrol boats, the Phaethon and the Arion were sent to Cyprus in a top-secret mission to assist in the naval operations which were taking place at Tillyria. Upon arrival to Cyprus, the two boats raised the Cypriot flag, installed guns on the boats, started patrolling the island and became the only two vessels serving in the Cypriot Navy at the time.

== Commissioning ==
Phaethon and Arion were donated by Anastasios Levendis to Cyprus in 1964 to patrol its coast and bolster the defences of the island against possible Turkish invasions and other attacks. The vessels were originally built in Germany in 1935 and their condition was poor when they were sent to Cyprus after undergoing incomplete repairs in Greece. The two boats left Greece without documentation or raising a flag and the crew were given fake identities and were not carrying identification documents. Dimitrios Mitsatsos, the commander of Phaedon, was a graduate of the Hellenic Naval Academy and there were also two commissioned officers while the rest of the crew were conscripts. Mitsatsos was also the commanding officer of the Arion.

== Battle ==
After patrolling the coast of Cyprus, Phaethon and Arion were eventually ordered to provide support to the fighters at Mansoura and Kokkina during the battle of Tillyria. After Mansoura fell, Phaethon experienced again problems in one of its two engines, this time due to pump failure. Subsequently, the captain received orders to proceed to a nearby bay to attempt repairs. As the two boats were travelling to the designated location, the crews observed an unidentified plane flying overhead. On 8 August 1964, while at the bay waiting for spare parts and ammunition, Mitsatsos saw a reconnaissance plane flying over the boats.

Having read the newspaper reports about the Turkish aerial attacks during the battle of Tillyria, he realised this was a precursor to an attack. Mitsatsos then ordered the Arion to leave, since it was not damaged, and told the crew of the Phaethon that they were free to leave because as conscripts they were under no obligation to fight. He also told the two officers to leave, since one officer was expecting a child and the other was a young father. The crew and officers chose to remain and fight. Mitsatsos then sent a message to the naval headquarters at Nicosia that he was expecting an aerial attack. He was advised to wait to be fired on first and then counterattack.

During the afternoon of 8 August 1964, Turkish F 100 fighter jets as part of a large-scale aerial attack, bombarded Phaethon while the boat was near Xeros Gulf. During the battle they also attacked the Phaethon using rockets and artillery shells. The speed of the boat was 7–8 knots due to the loss of one of its main engines. The attack happened in two waves. The first lasted for about 25 minutes and started at 16:25 local time when four Turkish jets attacked the boat. The second was an attack by two jets which started at 18:55 and lasted for about 30 minutes. The battle lasted about 40–50 minutes.

Only one of the boat's anti-aircraft guns was functioning while the other four guns were supplied with the wrong ammunition. The boat guns managed to down a Turkish fighter while hitting another which, according to the captain's estimation, was able to land in Turkey. Mitsatsos was wounded by Turkish fire in his right hand which was later amputated. He subsequently tried to avoid the attacking Turkish aircraft by navigating close to American freighters, which were loading ore nearby, hoping that the Turkish aircraft would not fire so close to ships under American flag. However, the Turkish jets continued their attack.

Under aircraft fire, with the helmsman killed, captain Mitsatsos navigated the boat with one arm. The second officer and the nurse were with him but subsequently were killed from aircraft fire. Mitsatsos grounded Phaethon on the beach ordering evacuation. Subsequently, the Turks bombed the boat with napalm and destroyed it, also killing other people nearby. From a total of 23 crew on board, six were killed during the attack and an additional six crew members were wounded. The two commissioned officers, and four sailors, one of whom was the ship nurse, died. The only Cypriot member of the crew was among those killed and was the seventh casualty.

== Aftermath ==
Dimitrios Mitsatsos, the commanding officer, was ordered not to reveal any details of the mission. Upon returning to Greece, the Greek authorities, to avoid publicity and inquiries from the press which could possibly reveal the covert operation, sent him to a hospital which was not fully operational and lacked the facilities to provide him with the necessary care to treat his wounded arm which was finally amputated due to gangrene. The boat commander was also not allowed to resume his career in the Greek Navy due to his missing arm which was deemed a factor that could possibly raise enquiries regarding the mission which caused the trauma. The order by the Navy to the captain against revealing any details of the operation was lifted by ministerial decision published in January 2016. On 30 May 2017, the remains of Eleftherios Anthis, crew member of Phaethon who lost his life when the patrol boat was sunk, were buried with military honours in the suburb of Garitsa, in Corfu. His remains, along with the remains of another 16 sailors serving on the Phaethon, were returned to Greece by the military casualties excavation service of Cyprus.

== Recognition ==
On 8 August 2007, the first liturgy in memory of the six Greek sailors killed in the battle took place at the cemetery of Saints Constantine and Eleni in Nicosia, where the fallen Greek sailors are buried. The seventh member of the crew that was killed, who was a Cypriot, is buried at the cemetery of Morphou. On 19 January 2016, in a ceremony at the hall "Cyprus House" of the embassy of Cyprus in Athens, Greek defence minister Panos Kammenos awarded commander Dimitrios Mitsatsos the Star of Value and Honour of Greece telling him "We thank you for what you offered to the fatherland and we principally thank you for the things you have endured to the present day". The ceremony was described as restitution for a "historical injustice" toward the crew of 22 men of the boat. In the same ceremony, Cypriot defence minister Christophoros Fokaidis also paid tribute to the families of the dead and the commander of the boat.
