= Battle of Tillyria =

1964 battle in Cyprus

Coordinates: 35°8′N 33°28′E

The Battle of Tillyria (Greek: Μάχη της Τηλλυρίας) or Battle of Kokkina (Greek: Μάχη των Κοκκίνων), known in Turkish as Erenköy Resistance (Turkish: Erenköy Direnişi), was a conflict on 6 August 1964 between units of the Cypriot National Guard and Turkish Cypriot armed groups in Kokkina area of Cyprus.

== Location ==
In 1964, at the time of the battle, Cyprus was governed by two sovereign state entities—the Republic of Cyprus and the British Sovereign Base Areas. The areas under the jurisdiction of the Republic of Cyprus included a number of large and fortified enclaves, inhabited by the island's Turkish Cypriot minority, which had receded into defensive positions around Turkish controlled villages following a major outbreak of civil unrest in 1963.

The Tillyria region of Cyprus was largely enclosed within the Morphou Administrative District in the north-west of the island, forming a large portion of the southern coastline of Morphou Bay. Located on this coastline at Kokkina was a heavily fortified Turkish enclave with between 750 and 1000 inhabitants.

== Political context ==
In November 1963, the President of the Republic of Cyprus, Archbishop Makarios III, proposed 13 constitutional amendments to the Constitution of the country's Government. These amendments were primarily aimed by the Makarios Administration at reorganising and regulating the distribution of Greek Cypriot and Turkish Cypriot manpower and voting power in the Government, civil services, military and police forces. These proposed amendments would also have affected the distribution of Greek Cypriot and Turkish Cypriot persons serving the judicial, executive and municipal service arms of the Government, in favour of a 70% to 30% split, weighted to the Greek Cypriot population majority (77%) over the Turkish Cypriot minority (18%).

While the Greek Cypriot and Turkish Cypriot sides of the Government were already largely polarised in favour of the interests of their respective "mother-states" (Greece and Turkey), the Turkish Cypriot representatives within the Government rejected Makarios' 13 proposed constitutional amendments, on the basis that it deprived the Turkish Cypriots of equal representation.

This resulted in the escalation of the Cypriot intercommunal violence in the events named the "Bloody Christmas", and the end of the Turkish Cypriot representation in the government of the Republic of Cyprus.

== Demographic and geopolitical context ==
A series of atrocities and intercommunal terrorist acts struck the island from 20-21 December 1963, as violence began to flare between Turkish and Greek Cypriot extremists. This violence escalated quickly and was reinforced by pre-existing nationalist sentiments on both sides, including a Turkish desire for "Taksim" (or division of the island into Turkish and Greek portions), and a Greek desire for "Enosis" (or union of the entire island with Greece). The main proponents of this violence were the Turkish Resistance Organisation (TMT), and the Greek Cypriot paramilitaries though it is not clear how much of the violence can actually be attributed to directives issued by these groups.

In mid-1964 the Cypriot Government became aware that the Turkish Cypriots, who by now had almost universally receded into enclaves nationwide, were becoming increasingly well equipped with small arms, squad automatic weapons and mortars that would not have otherwise been made available to them through legal ports of entry. The Turkish Cypriot-held deep-water dock at Kokkina, in Tillyria region, was immediately suspected as the focus of a Turkish shipping point for the supply of arms to the Turkish Cypriots from mainland Turkey.

Kokkina had been central to the provision of arms to the TMT from Turkey since 1958. The arms shipment was carried out by local people called bereketçiler using small rowboats, and had started off as a local initiative of three young men in August 1958. These young men had rowed to Turkey without approval from Rauf Denktaş and been arrested there, but realising the value this enterprise had for the arms provision to the newly founded TMT, the Turkish and Turkish Cypriot authorities started using the port for regular clandestine arms shipments. Following the eruption of intercommunal violence, the Turkish Cypriots began to bribe British soldiers stationed on the island to transport arms to other Turkish enclaves. On 27 May 1964 the Greek Cypriot authorities caught Keith Marley, a British aircrew, as he was transporting arms from Kokkina. He confessed to having done this five more times in the past and that other colleagues were involved in similar arrangements. Other nationalities, including members of UNFICYP, such as Swedish peacekeepers, were also caught at this time.

The Greek Cypriot reaction was a scramble for arms. In 1965 a surveillance radar station was installed at Mt Kormakitis in Kyrenia district in order to observe illegal shipping movements between Turkey and Kokkina, and a total of six fast naval attack craft were procured from the Soviet Union in order to triple the strength of the Cyprus Navy. As an additional measure, two heavy Greek Cypriot patrol gunboats were stationed near Morphou in order to launch a naval strike, should the need arise.

While Greece remained largely silent on the issue of the Kokkina shipping point, the Greek Government gave the Greek Cypriots assurances that it would support an armed intervention at Kokkina, should the situation become untenable. The Commander of the Greek Cypriot National Guard, Col. Georgios Grivas, returned to Cyprus from Athens in late July 1964, after receiving an audience with members of the Greek Government. Shortly thereafter, the Greek Cypriots began to mobilise for an armed intervention at Kokkina, despite Turkish threats to counter-intervene by force should exactly that happen.

== Action ==
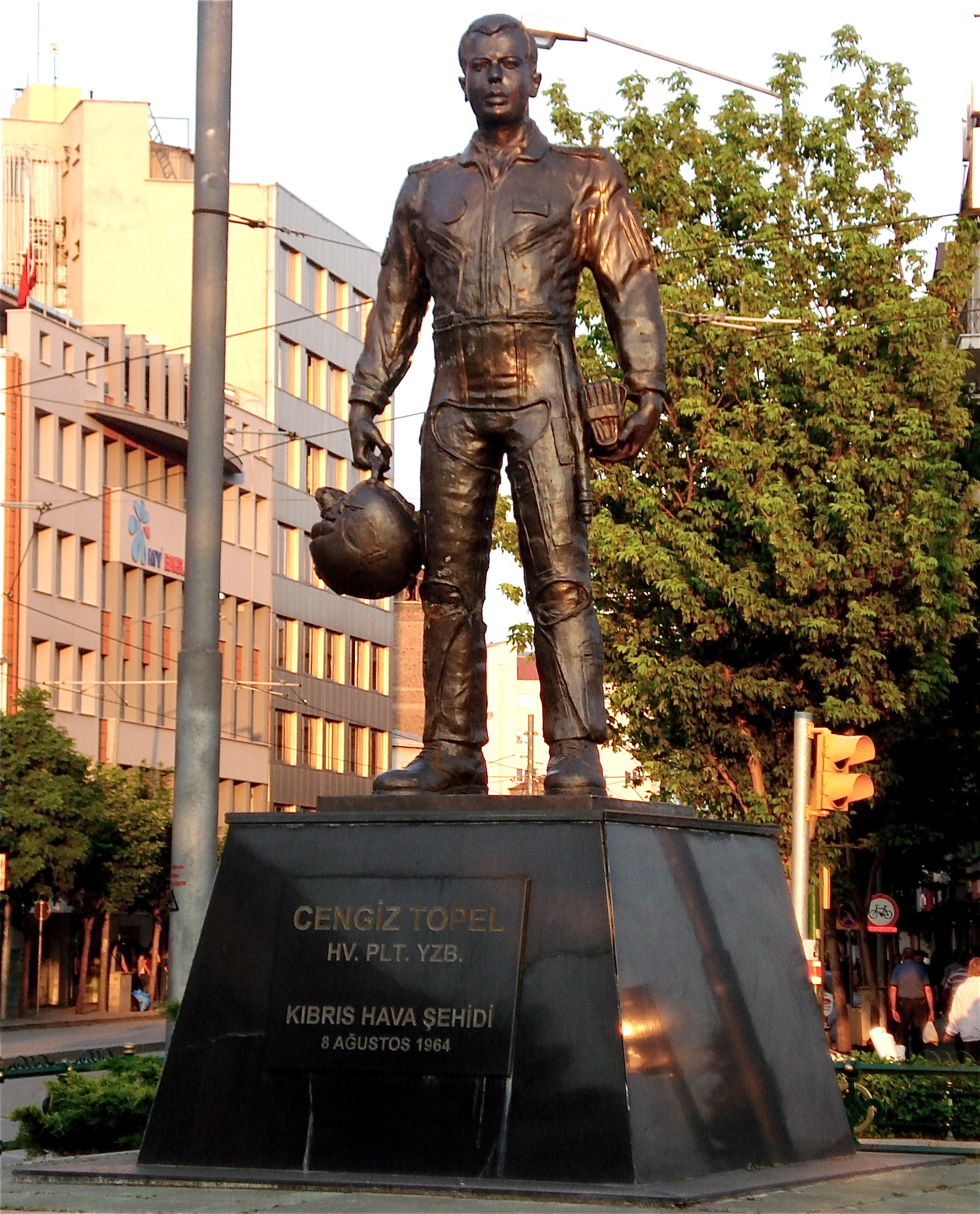
Statue of Turkish pilot, Cengiz Topel in Eskişehir, Turkey, one of the pilots sent by Turkey to bomb positions in the Republic of Cyprus.

In the days leading up to the invasion the Cypriot National Guard began to mobilise infantry, artillery and armored forces for an assault on Kokkina. On 6 August 1964 the Cypriot National Guard commenced its attack. For two days, Cypriot National Guard forces laid down support fire with six 25-pounder guns and approximately twelve mortars, coordinated with 20mm and 40mm cannon fire from the Cyprus Navy patrol boats Phaethon and Arion. Under this barrage, infantry progressed slowly into the enclave with cover from overlapping machine gun fire, but found that the Turkish Cypriots had organised their own machine guns and mortars into an effective formation. The battle quickly degraded into a low-intensity exchange of sniping and support fire, as both sides dug into the difficult terrain.

On 8 August 1964, after waiting for nearly two days, Turkey intervened, once it had become clear that the Greek Cypriots would not withdraw from Kokkina, but simply commit more and more siege forces until the Turkish Cypriots ran out of supplies.

On the morning of 8 August, the Cypriot patrol boats Phaethon and Arion were attacked by Turkish Air Force jets as they sailed close to Xeros Harbour, Morphou Bay. The boats commenced evasive manoeuvers and put up anti-aircraft fire. The Phaethon was quickly strafed with 75mm rockets and burst into flames, killing seven crew members and wounding several others. Its engine still running, the surviving crew managed to guide it aground and then abandoned ship.

As the Arion continued to evade the attack, a second formation of Turkish F-100 Super Sabre jets came in low to drop bombs against Greek Cypriot National Guard.

Between 8–9 August 1964 the Turkish Air Force was given free rein to attack multiple targets within Tillyria, including a number of Greek Cypriot villages. As a result, heavy bombing caused significant casualties among the civilian population. Turkish pilot Cengiz Topel and his forces illegally dropped napalm bombs onto Greek Cypriot civilians and civilian-populated areas, leaving many Greek civilians dead and homeless; several animals were also killed in the bombing. A British Pathé video documented the attack on civilians, noting its "tragic aftermath". 29 civilians were reported as dead in the aftermath of the attack. Cypriot civilian casualties were reported as a result of heavy air attacks (dropping incendiary napalm bombs) against several populated locations, including Kato Pyrgos.

Turkish planes also attacked sites controlled by the Cypriot National Guard, killing civilians and a number of military personnel and destroying a Marmon Herrington Mk-IVF armoured car.

== Immediate outcome ==
The immediate geographical result of the conflict in the Tillyria region was that four villages were evacuated and the Kokkina enclave was effectively reduced to a narrow beachhead. However, the Greek Cypriot National Guard had failed to storm the inner defenses of the enclave, thus leaving the Turkish beachhead essentially intact.

Fighting in the region ceased on 10 August 1964, but Kokkina's value to the Turkish military dwindled, as the Greek Cypriots had effectively isolated it from the coastal road and encircled it with enough forces to guarantee its destruction by the time of the 1965 expansion of the National Guard.

== Legacy ==
On 20 July 1974, Turkey launched an invasion of the island, following a Greek Junta sponsored coup d'état against President Makarios, aimed at uniting the island with Greece. The second Turkish offensive, codenamed Attila 2, took place between 14 and 18 August 1974, and extended as far west as the Kokkina enclave.

Currently, Kokkina (Turkish: Erenköy) is an exclave of Northern Cyprus. Whilst this exclave was only accessible from the rest of the de facto state by sea for 46 years, it has been accessible by road since 2010, following the opening of a checkpoint between Kato Pyrgos and Limnitis.
