= Cengiz Topel =

Turkish fighter pilot (1934–1964)

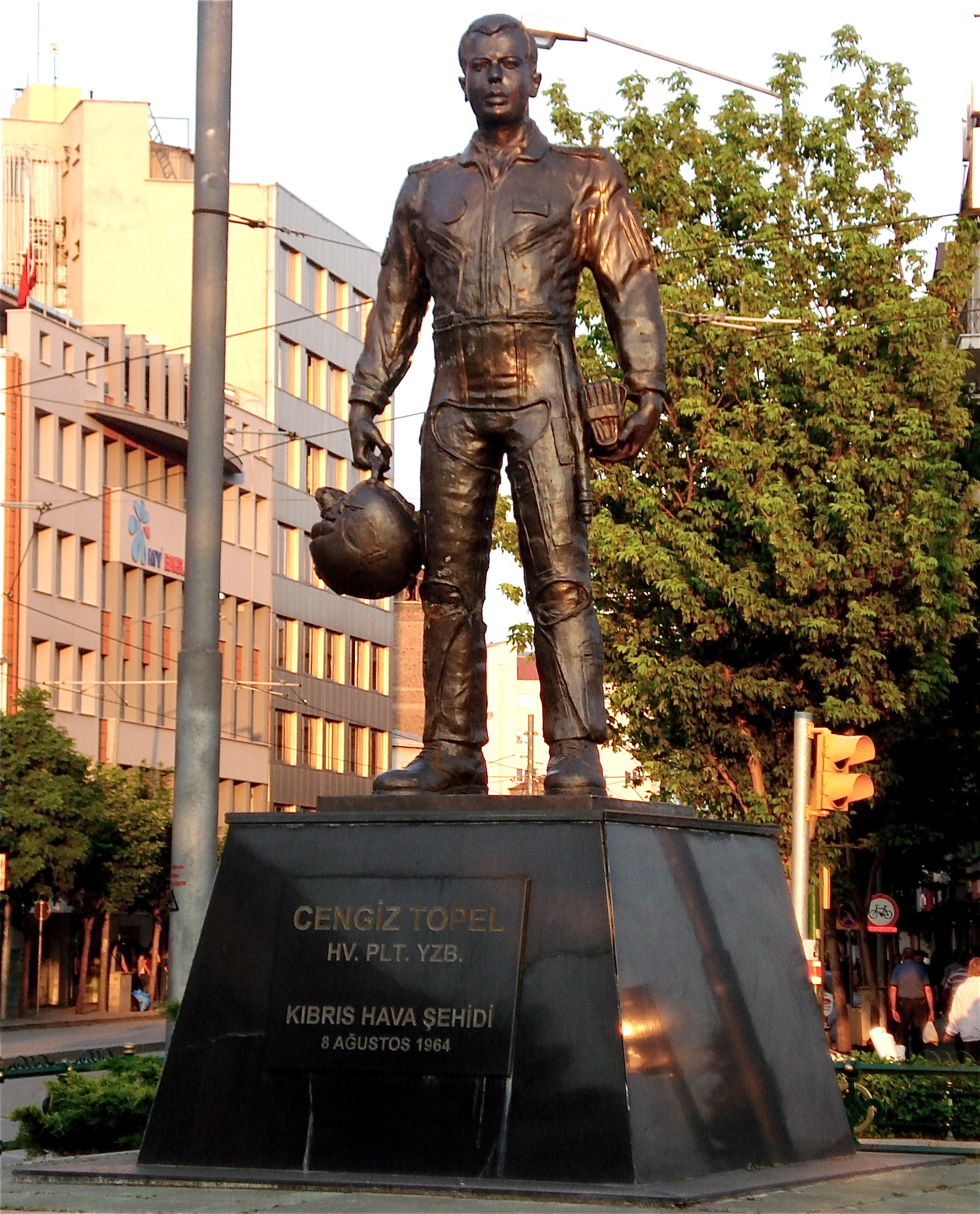
- Statue of Topel in Eskişehir, Turkey
- Born: September 2, 1934; İzmit, Turkey
- Died: August 8, 1964 (aged 29); Paphos District, Cyprus
- Military career
- Allegiance: Turkey
- Branch: Turkish Air Force
- Service years: 1955–1964
- Rank: Captain
- Unit: 112th Air Squadron
- Conflicts: Battle of Tylliria (executed)

Cengiz Topel (September 2, 1934 – August 8, 1964) was a fighter pilot and captain of the Turkish Air Force.

Topel was killed in the Battle of Tillyria, becoming the first war casualty of the Turkish Air Force in Cyprus. His name was posthumously given to several schools, neighborhoods, streets and avenues.

== Early life ==
Topel was born in İzmit, Kocaeli on September 2, 1934 to Mebuse Hanım and Hakkı Bey, a tobacco expert from Trabzon. He was the third of four children.

He started attending primary school in Bandırma, and later continued it in Gönen after his father was reassigned there. His father died in 1943, when Topel was 9, and the family moved to Istanbul. Topel completed his primary education at Kadıköy Elementary School and his secondary education at Kadıköy Yeldeğirmeni School. After briefly attending Haydarpaşa High School, Topel transferred to Kuleli Military High School. He graduated from the school in 1953 and entered the Turkish Military Academy, graduating in 1955 with the rank of second lieutenant.

== Career ==
His interest in aviation led him to the Turkish Air Force. The same year he graduated from the Turkish Military Academy, he took part in a NATO training program for Turkish pilots; attending the program in Gaziemir, and later Canada. During his 20-month stay in Canada, he completed a language course, basic flight training with the T-6 aircraft, advanced flight training with the T-33, and fighter training with the F-86. He logged 181.35 hours on the T-6, 83.15 hours on the T-33, and 25 hours on the F-86. In 1957, he earned his pilot wings and returned to Turkey, where he began serving at the 5th Main Jet Base Command in Merzifon.

In 1961, he was assigned to the 1st Main Jet Base in Eskişehir, where he was trained as a combat-ready pilot on the F-100 aircraft. In 1963, he was promoted to the rank of captain.

On August 8, 1964, during the Battle of Tylliria, he led a four-fighter flight of the 112th Air Squadron leaving Eskişehir Air Base around 17:00 local time for Cyprus. After Topel's F-100 Super Sabre had dropped bombs on Mansoura Mountains. He was later hit by 40mm anti-aircraft fire from a National Guard gun emplacement and shot-down. A parachute-clad Topel ejected from his aircraft, landing on a road near the Greek village of Peristeronori between the Turkish settlements of Lefke, Gaziveren, Elye and Çamlıköy. He was allegedly captured by three Greek soldiers. Though it is not certain what happened to Topel while in Greek Cypriot custody, he did not emerge from the ordeal alive. Greek Cypriot authorities claimed that Topel had been injured and died of wounds after being treated in hospital. Turkish sources, however, have alleged that Topel was subjected to torture while in captivity and died as a result of mistreatment. Some Turkish accounts, citing an autopsy report and photographs taken after his death, have further alleged that he was severely beaten and mutilated while still alive. Following intense diplomatic efforts, Turkey received Topel's body from the Greek Cypriots on Aug. 12, 1964. On August 14, 1964 he was buried at the Edirnekapı Martyr's Cemetery in Istanbul.

== Legacy ==
Topel is remembered as a Turkish hero. His personal belongings are displayed at the Istanbul Military Museum in Harbiye and he is known as the first Turkish air combat loss in Cyprus.

A former Turkish Air Force base located near İzmit, currently in use as Cengiz Topel Naval Air Station, is named after him. A monument was erected on the coastal road in the village Gemikonağı near Lefke in Northern Cyprus, where he had landed by parachute. A bronze statue in Eskişehir depicts him in flight suit. A number of places, including schools, in Turkey and a hospital in Northern Cyprus are named after him.
