= Kokkina =

Exclave of the de facto Northern Cyprus, de jure part of the Republic of Cyprus

Kokkina: Κόκκινα (Greek); Erenköy (Turkish)
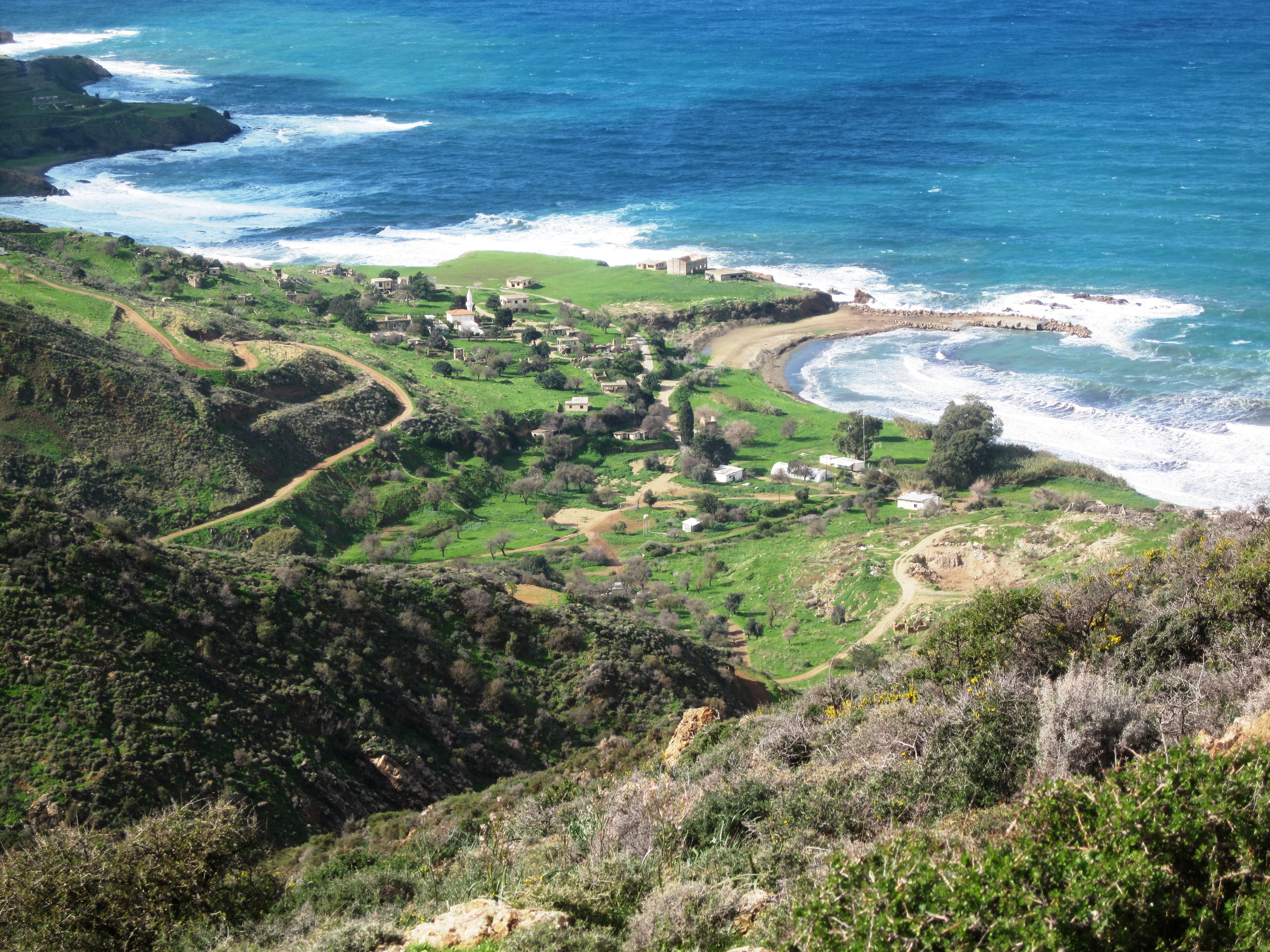
- Interactive map of Kokkina
- Location within Cyprus
- Coordinates: 35°10′45″N 32°36′42″E
- Country (de jure): Cyprus
  - District: Nicosia District
- Country (de facto): Northern Cyprus
  - District: Lefke District

Kokkina (Greek: Κόκκινα, locally [ˈkot͡ʃːʰina]; Turkish: Erenköy or Koççina) is a coastal exclave (pene-exclave) of the de facto Northern Cyprus, and a former Turkish Cypriot enclave in Cyprus. It is surrounded by mountainous territory, with the Morphou Bay on its northern flank. Kokkina sits several kilometres west of mainland Northern Cyprus and is a place with symbolic significance to Turkish Cypriots, because of the events of August 1964 (cf. Battle of Tillyria). In 1976, all Kokkina inhabitants were transferred to Yialousa (renamed Yeni Erenköy or "New Erenköy" in Turkish) and the exclave has since functioned as a North Cyprus Defence Force military camp for the Turkish forces.

== History ==
The Tylliria/Dillirga region, where Kokkina is situated, had been a place of intense confrontation between Greek Cypriot and Turkish Cypriot communities during the inter-communal struggle of 1963–1964. On 4 April 1964, armed groups originating from both communities had fought over a strategic location overlooking the region's only highway. There had also been several sporadic incidents of gunfire between villages of the region. On 8 April 1964, the United Nations Peacekeeping Force in Cyprus (UNFICYP) managed to arrange a ceasefire which was enforced by stationing UNFICYP troops at several critical points.

The government of the Republic of Cyprus viewed Kokkina as a point of insertion for Turkish paramilitaries and weaponry in Cyprus because about 500 Turkish Cypriot volunteers who had been trained and armed in Turkey had landed there. So, on 6 August 1964, elements of the Greek Cypriot National Guard and Hellenic Army units led by General Georgios Grivas attacked the area around Kokkina and surrounded the village forcing its defenders and the civilian population to retreat to a narrow beachhead. The defenders consisted of elements of the Turkish Resistance Organization and a number of the volunteers mentioned above. A heavy artillery barrage (with naval support) of the beachhead followed causing a number of casualties and heavy damage to the village.

The defenders, while completely out-powered and lacking supplies, managed to hold their positions until 8 August when Turkey decided to intervene. The threat of a Turkish military escalation and a resolution of the United Nations Security Council calling for a ceasefire, ended the stand-off. A ceasefire was declared on 9 August 1964 and UNFICYP forces were once again deployed to the area.

Turkey claimed that the aerial attack and threat of further intervention were justified by her right to protect the Turkish Cypriot population under the 1960 Treaty of Guarantee. The village was heavily damaged by the artillery barrage and UN forces declared it a disaster area and brought in much-needed supplies for the civilians.

== Significance ==
Since December 1963, thousands of Turkish Cypriots became concentrated in enclaves, as a result of the intercommunal fighting (see Cyprus problem). Kokkina was one of the last port areas under Turkish Cypriot control and a vital supply link with Turkey for the fighters.

In the eyes of the Greek Cypriot authorities, Kokkina was a threat to the nation's security posed by Turkish Cypriot paramilitaries and cutting it off would have severed Turkish armed groups from resupply and reinforcement.

When the Turkish military invaded Cyprus in 1974, Kokkina was a specific objective. The exclave became part of the Turkish Federated State of North Cyprus in 1975, then part of the Turkish Republic of Northern Cyprus when independence was unilaterally declared in November 1983. However, this declaration of independence was condemned as legally invalid by United Nations Security Council Resolution 541 (1983) and has yet to be recognised by any sovereign state except Turkey.

== Today ==
Within the exclave at the village cemetery, there are 13 carefully tended graves of Turkish Cypriots who were killed at the siege at Kokkina. The village itself still carries heavy battle damage. A museum memorialising the defenders and the North Cypriot military (Security Forces Command) is also at the village. Kokkina is the site of annual memorial ceremonies attended by high-ranking dignitaries of both the TRNC and Turkish governments. On Greek Cypriot maps, the village is referred to by its Greek name of Kokkina.
