= Cyprus Police Academy =

Coordinates: 35.145280°N 33.379145°E

- Greek: Αστυνομική Ακαδημία Κύπρου; Turkish: Kıbrıs Polis Akademisi
- Cyprus Police Academy Logo (since 2011)
- Former names: Police Training School
- Motto: Νόμος Γνώση Ήθος
- Motto in English: Law Knowledge Morals
- Type: Police Academy
- Established: 1990
- Location: Nicosia, Cyprus
- Website: http://www.police.gov.cy/

The Cyprus Police Academy (Greek: Αστυνομική Ακαδημία Κύπρου, Turkish: Kıbrıs Polis Akademisi) is the main educational institution for law enforcement officers in Cyprus. It was founded in 1990 in succession to the Police Training School. It is recognised as a higher education institution by the Cyprus Council for the Recognition of Higher Education Qualifications (ΚΥ.Σ.Α.Τ.Σ.) and operates under the Ministry of Justice and Public Order as a police unit in the organisational structure of the Cyprus Police. It works on a permanent basis, both for the education of cadet constables and for the training of all police members irrelevant of their rank. Primary mission of the academy is to provide adequate education and training to all members of the service, so that they become competent to perform the diverse tasks of law enforcement.

== History ==
Historically the first police training school dates back to 1892 through a legislation of the time by the then British colonial administration for the establishment and operation of a Military Police (Gendarmerie). The training offered was based on military standards. By 1945, the recruits were trained at the then Police Headquarters which at the time was located on the premises which is now the Paphos Gate Police Station in Nicosia. In 1945 the Police School was founded at the Kyrenia Castle and in 1951 the School moved from Kyrenia to Strovolos at the location where the Nicosia District Divisional Headquarters was housed until October 2008 and currently the Nicosia Traffic Department is located at. On 1975 the School moved from the location that was housed in Strovolos, giving the facilities to the Nicosia District Divisional Headquarters, that had to move due to the Turkish Invasion. It moved to the same location that the Cyprus Police Headquarters is currently located, where it remains until today.

In 1990 it was upgraded from a police school to a police academy, and the courses were enriched in such a way, to keep up with the modern developments in police training. In 1996 the academy was accredited and recognized as a public higher education institution, and in 2003 all the courses offered were revised with emphasis on the police cadets program as to modernize it.

== Organisation and Structure ==
The Cyprus Police Academy operates:

- The School for Sergeants and Constables
- The Officers School
- The school for foreign Languages

along with several offices such as

- The Border Guard and EU issues office/ Frontex
- The CEPOL office
- The Recruitment office

== See also ==
- Cypriot National Guard
- Cyprus Air Forces
- Cyprus Civil Defence
- Cyprus Fire Service
- Cyprus Joint Rescue Coordination Center
- Cyprus Navy
- Cyprus Police
- Cyprus Port & Marine Police
