= Presidential Guard Unit (Cyprus) =

- Μονάδα Προεδρικής Φρουράς
- Active: 1979 (officially) – present
- Country: Cyprus
- Agency: Cyprus Police
- Role: Protection
- Headquarters: Nicosia

Commanders
- Current commander: Panikos Stavrou
- Notable commanders: Andreas Theofanous

Notables
- Significant operation(s): Attempts against President Makarios
- Anniversaries: 10 February

The Presidential Guard Unit (Greek: Μονάδα Προεδρικής Φρουράς) is responsible for the protection of the President of Cyprus and his family. It was officially established in 1979 and is part of the Cyprus Police.

== History ==
Though the Presidential Guard was only officially established in 1979, the President of Cyprus (And others placed under their protection), has always had his personal protection detail and was especially active between 1970 and 1974 in which multiple attempts against Makarios' life were made.

On March 8, 1970, Makarios was going to go from the Archdiocese to Machairas Monastery to commemorate Grigoris Afxentiou, an EOKA hero who was burned by the British after a botched raid of his cave. Due to the fact that there had been intelligence that an attempt on his life would happen at the Monastery, the Presidential Guard increased security there but not at the Archbishops Palace thus leaving Makarios exposed and as such, on the 8th, as Makarios' helicopter took off from the Archbishops palace, the helicopter was met with automatic gunfire by a group of people on the roof of the Pancyprian Gymnasium with his helicopter pilot being hit but managing to land the helicopter safely and the attempt as a consequence failing.

On July 15, 1974, the Cypriot National Guard with small elements of EOKA B executed a coup against President Makarios and one of the main objectives was the takeover of the Presidential Palace and the assassination of Makarios. Armoured units and special forces got into a heavy gunfight with the presidential guard and in the meantime, Makarios, alongside his detail, managed to escape through a backdoor and was escorted by his detail to Paphos and the next day was airlifted to Malta by the British Armed Forces.

The post invasion period has been mostly peaceful with regards to the Presidential Guard's duties but there have been isolated incidents of alleged attempts against Cypriot presidents, one of which being when Antonis Fanieros (A Cypriot businessman who didn't get along well with Clerides) entered the yacht (After allegedly being told by friends of his in the Police) belonging to then-President Glafcos Clerides and being arrested by the Presidential Guard for allegedly attempting to assassinate the President, something which Faniero denied.

== See also ==
- Cyprus Police
- Cyprus Police Aviation Unit
- Cyprus Police Museum
