= Obz =

Obz could refer to:

- The suburb of Observatory, Cape Town
- Occupy Buffer Zone, a protest movement on Cyprus
