= Occupy Buffer Zone =

- Part of Occupy protests
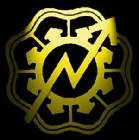
- Date: 15 October 2011 - June 2012
- Location: Buffer Zone, between the Ledra/Lokmacı Checkpoints, Nicosia, Cyprus
- Also known as: OBZ, Occupying the Invisible Green Line, 15th of October Movement, No Borders Camp.

Occupy Buffer Zone (OBZ) was a protest movement that began on October 15, 2011 by Greek Cypriot and Turkish Cypriot activists, in the Ledra Street checkpoint, in Nicosia, Cyprus. The movement began with a weekly occupation of the checkpoint, which is located in the buffer zone that divides the island's territory and capital into the self-declared Turkish Republic of Northern Cyprus and the Republic of Cyprus since the Turkish invasion of Cyprus in 1974. On November 19 of 2011 the occupation of the buffer zone became permanent.

Influenced by the global Occupy Movement, Occupy Buffer Zone aimed to protest and publicise the problems of the global economic and political system, as well as to raise awareness of how "the Cyprus Problem is but one of the many symptoms of an unhealthy global system". The movement emphasised the connection between the development of the Cyprus problem and the economic and political interests associated with the international economic and political status quo.

== Occupy Buffer Zone's general statement ==
The movement's general statement distributed to passers-by in the buffer zone read:

This is an inclusive movement functioning within some principal umbrella concepts for which we initially united, these are:

The reunification of Cyprus.

To raise awareness of how the Cyprus Problem is but one of the many symptoms of an unhealthy global system.

It is important to elaborate on the intended inclusiveness of the last point.

We have occupied the space of the buffer zone to express with our presence our mutual desire for reunification and to stand in solidarity with the wave of unrest which has come as a response to the failings of the global systemic paradigm. We want to promote understanding of the local problem within this global context and in this way show how the Cyprus Problem is but one of the many symptoms of an unhealthy system. In this way, we have reclaimed the space of the buffer zone to create events (screenings, talks etc.) and media of these events, which relate to the system as a whole and its numerous and diverse consequences.

Opinions expressed in this manner are not necessarily of the entire group, only the umbrella points of reunification and solidarity with the global movement can be assumed to be.

== Development ==
The movement began on 15 October 2011 with a weekly occupation of the buffer zone in Ledra/Lokmacı street in Nicosia. A group of about 20 Greek and Turkish Cypriot activists had gathered in Eleftheria Square in Nicosia as a response to the global call for a protest on the 15th of October. Through discussion they decided to move the occupation from the Eleftheria Square to the buffer zone located in the Ledra/Lokmacı street. The buffer zone was occupied subsequently on the 22nd and the 29th of October and the 5th of November. On the 19th of November activists set up tents and made camp in the buffer zone for the night. The decision was then taken that the occupation would become permanent. On 1 January 2012 the activists further occupied the abandoned buildings that were located in the buffer zone. The buildings have been used by the movement for its cultural and political activities, such as hosting and developing various workshops and the movement's General Assemblies. The United Nations Peacekeeping Force in Cyprus (UNFICYP) asked the activists to leave the buffer zone on 14 January 2012 claiming that the occupation did not meet United Nations' regulation for activities in the buffer zone, but it did not employ any forceful methods for the evacuation of the area. After the Cyprus Police raid on 6 April 2012, the movement's activities and organisation began to fade. By June 2012, the occupation of the buffer zone was essentially over.

Stefanos Evripidou on Cyprus Mail wrote on 8 April that the occupation of the buffer zone "resulted in forming rare consensus among the three forces on the ground, Cyprus police, the Turkish army and the UN, over the unsuitability of their choice of location."

== Police raid ==
On 6 April 2012, a Cyprus Police force from the Republic of Cyprus gathered in the area occupied by the activists and raided the occupied buildings at around 10:15pm. The anti-terrorist Mobile Immediate Action Unit and the anti-drugs department led the police force. Policemen, equipped with guns, helmets and batons smashed the door and entered the building. A sequence of screaming and sounds of smashing and breaking followed. The police reported that it made 28 arrests, including 11 minors and that it had confiscated 1 gram (1/28 oz) of cannabis.

The police was reported to have used excessive and unjustified violence in the operation. Eyewitnesses reported that the police repeatedly hit a 24-year-old woman, "causing a massive bump to her forehead, as well as multiple cuts and bruises". Reports were also made of sexual assault on a 19-year-old woman, the beating of two activists that were arrested in the building, and for unjustified violence on the crowd of activists and passers by that had gathered outside the building.

A demonstration against police brutality and the police raid was organised on 12 April by political student magazine Skapoula, whose members had been participating in the movement and were arrested by the police on 6 April.

== Images ==
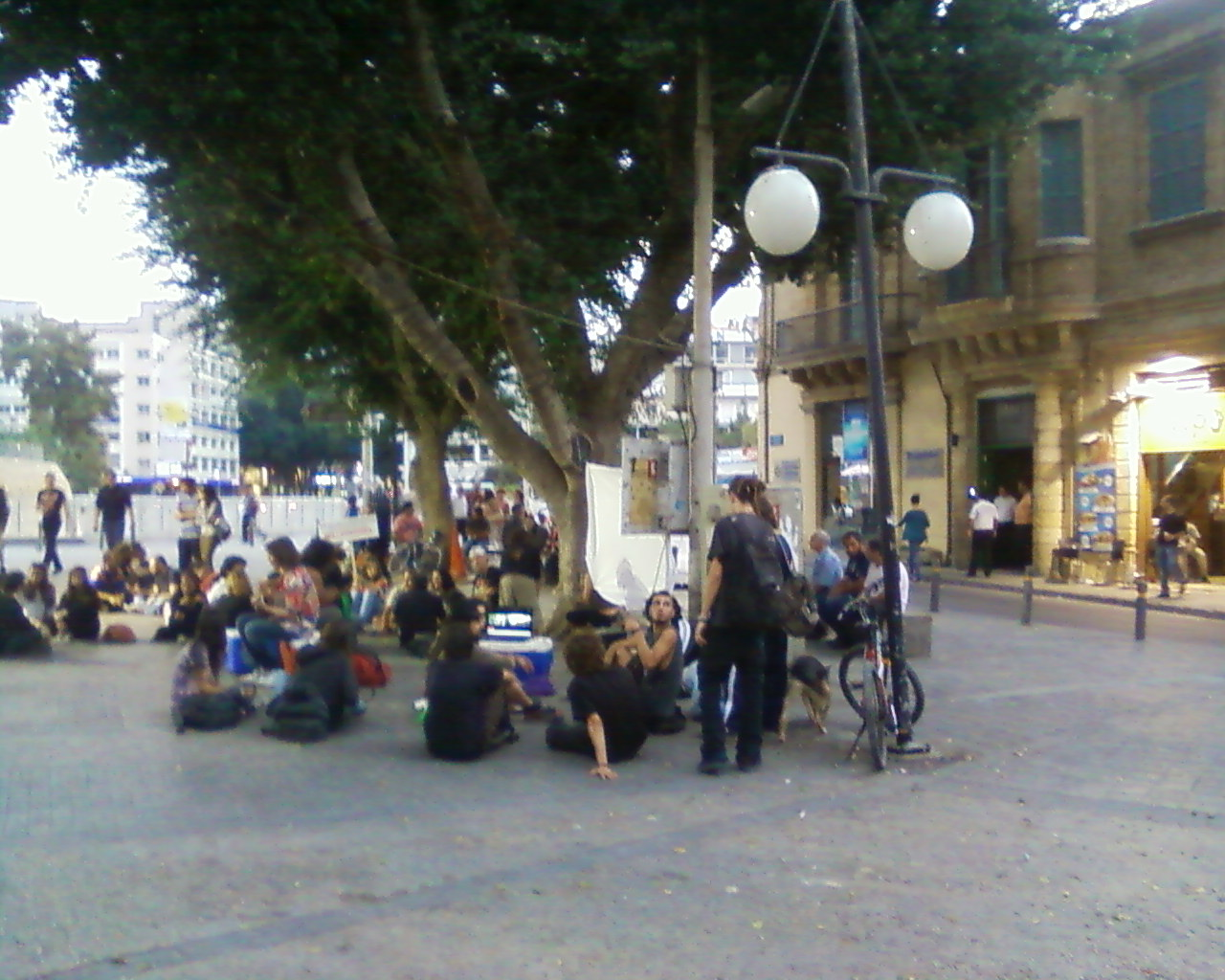
First meeting of the Occupy Buffer Zone movement in Eleftheria Square, 15 of October, 2011.

Tents of protesters at Ledra/Lokmacı checkpoint, December 2011.

Tents and a protester's bicycle at Ledra/Lokmacı checkpoint, December 2011.

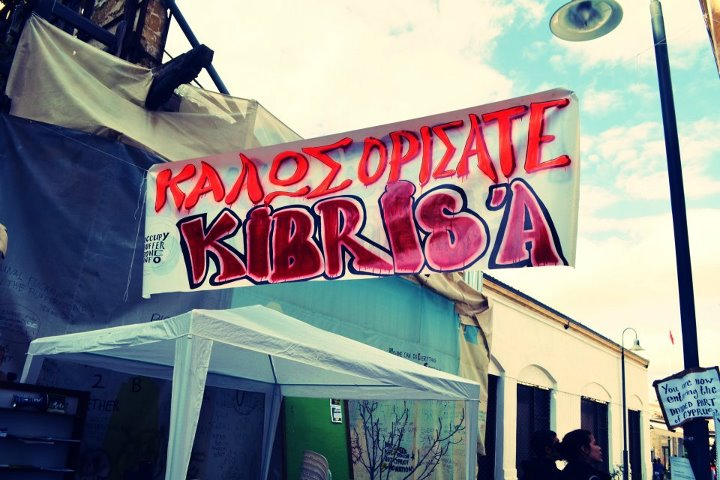
Banner raised above the Ledra/Lokmacı checkpoint, welcoming passers by. On the bottom right one can read a poster saying "You are now entering the divided part of Cyprus". December 2011.

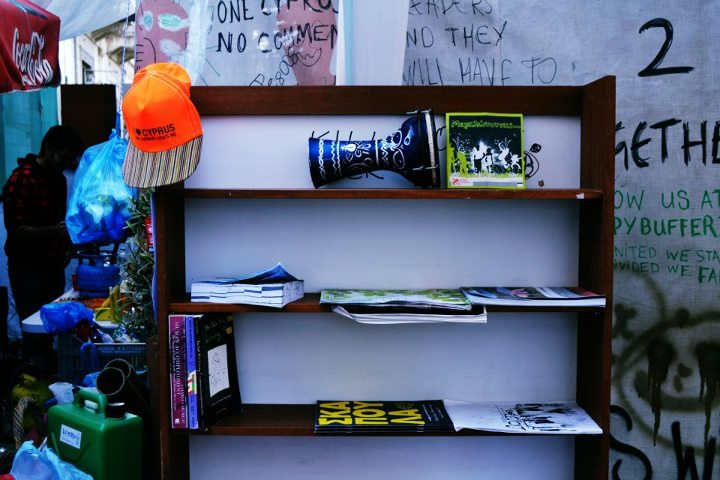
The beginning of what later became the Occupy Buffer Zone library, December 2011.

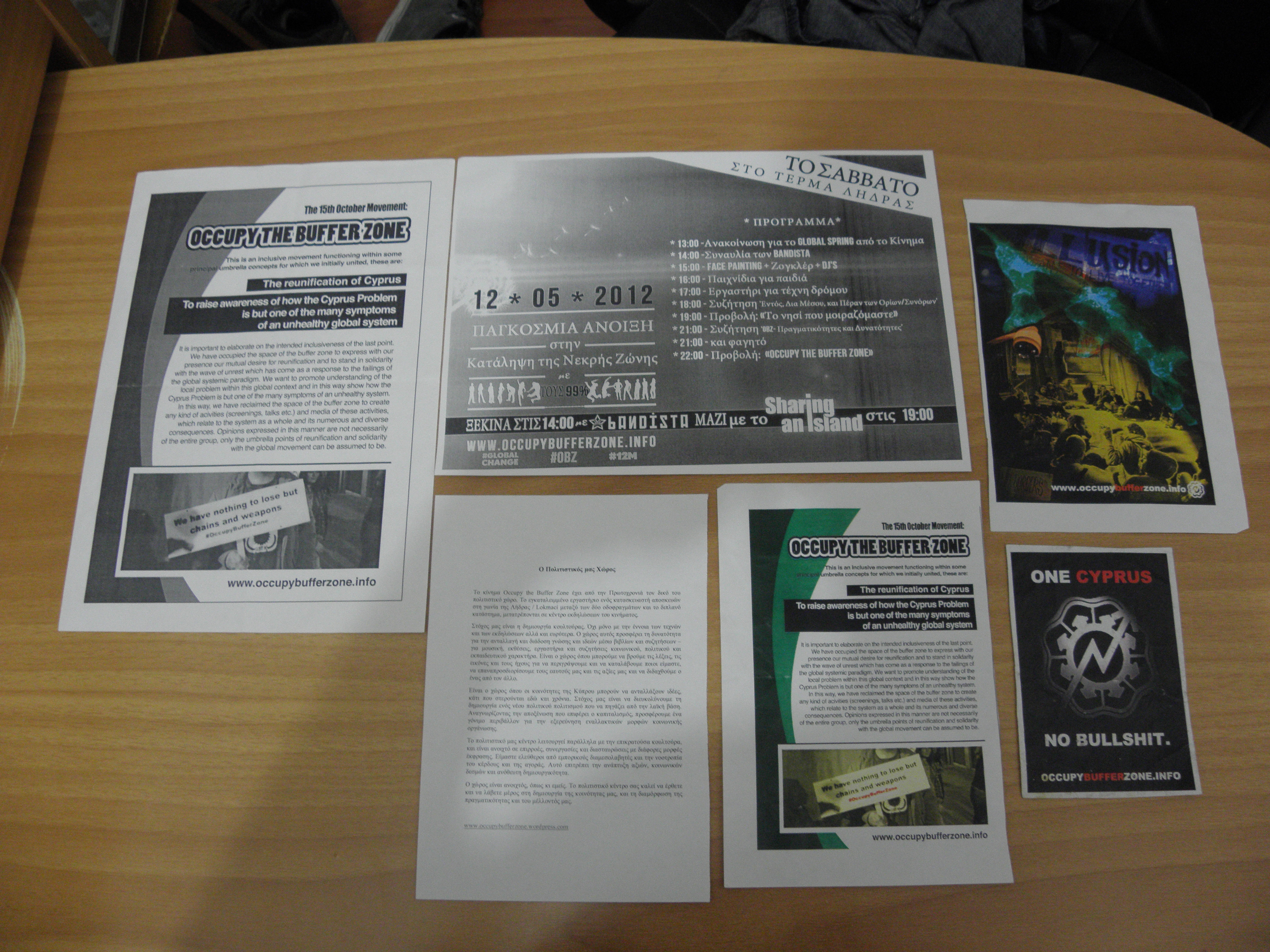
Various leaflets that were distributed by the movement.

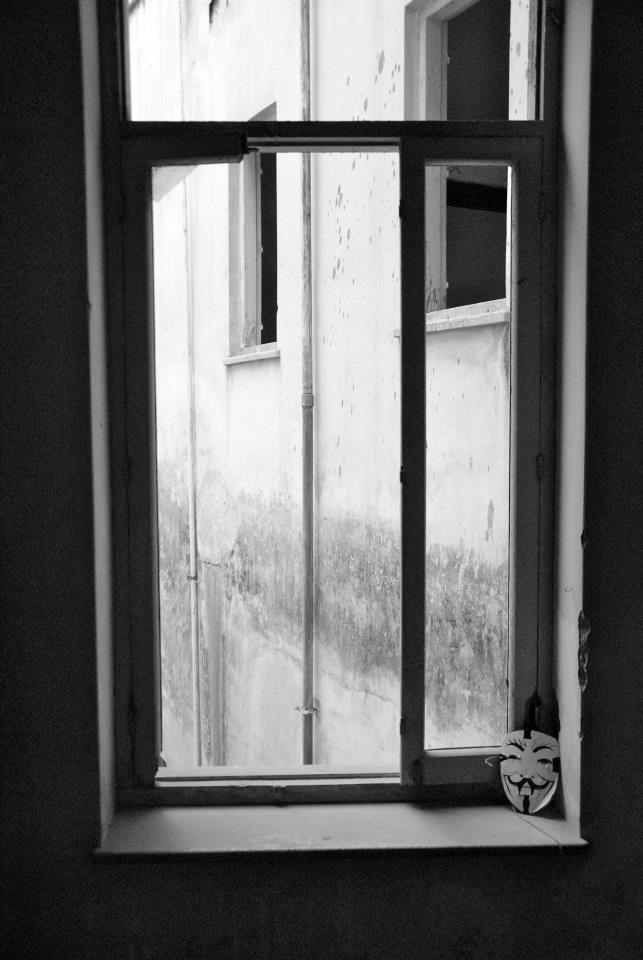
Window of occupied building, with a Guy Fawkes mask placed next to it. Guy Fawkes masks have often been used as a symbol of resistance in the Occupy movement.

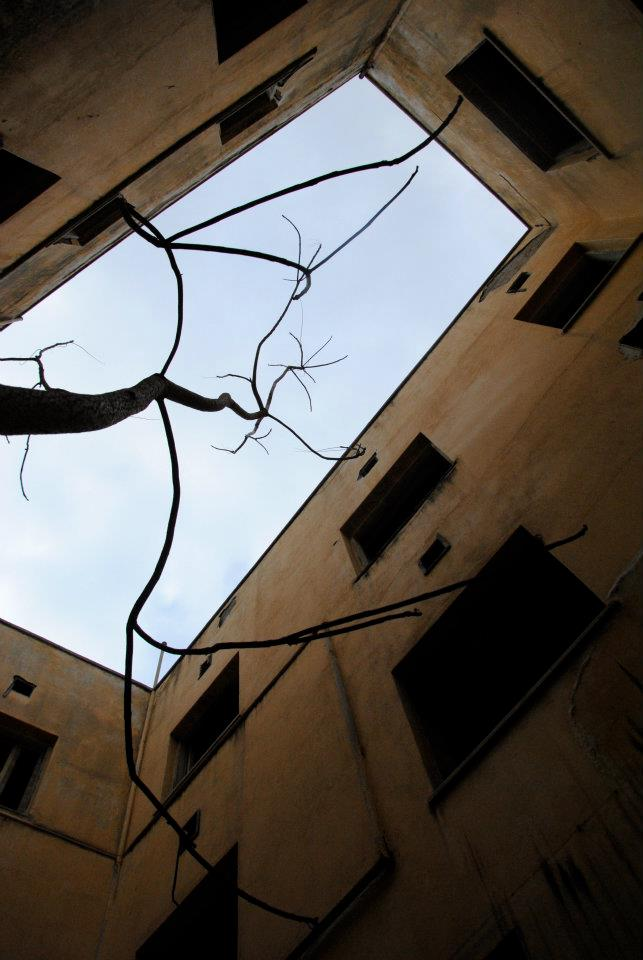
View from inside the small courtyard of the occupied building.

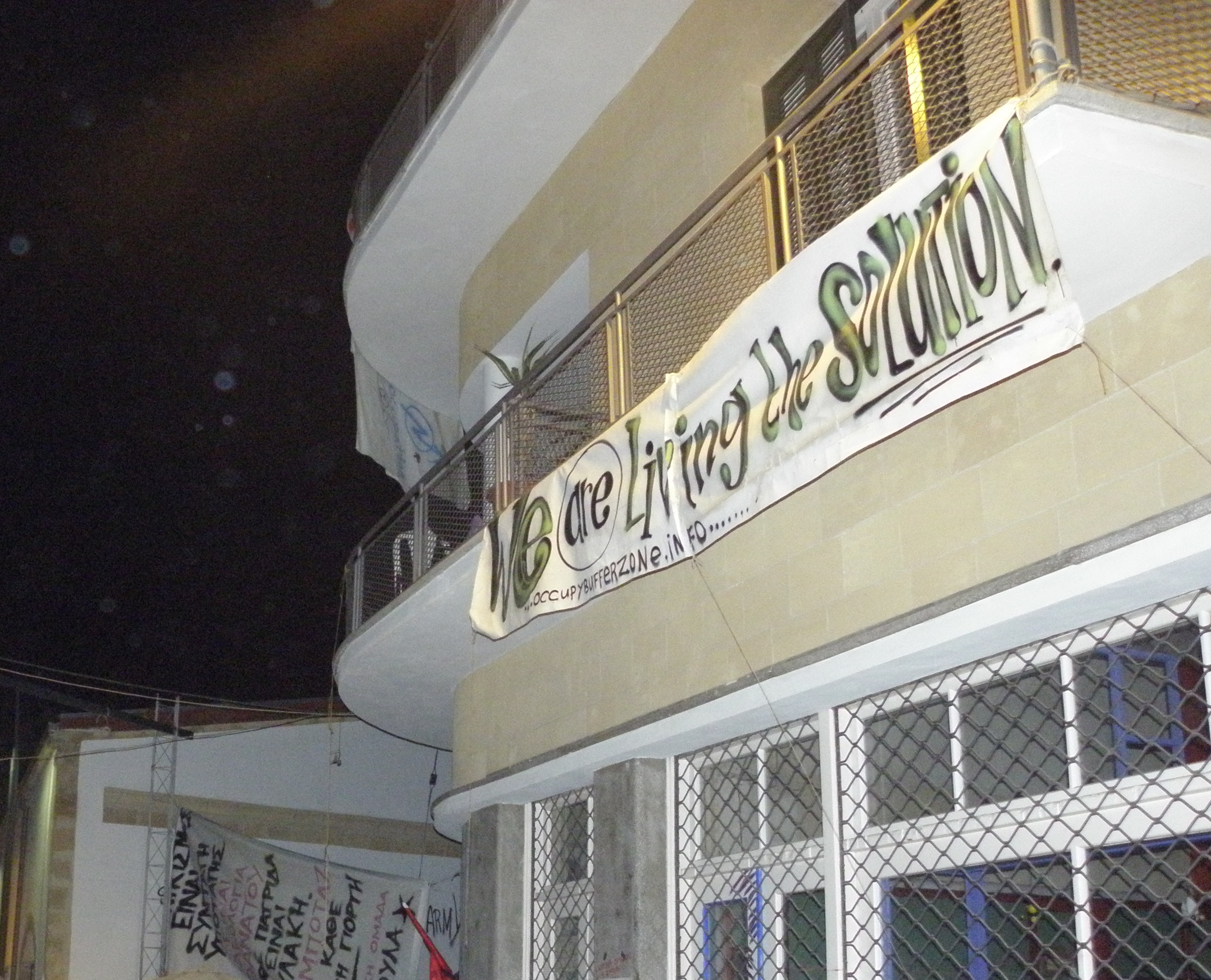
Balcony of occupied building at Occupy Buffer Zone. The banner refers to the Cyprus Dispute.

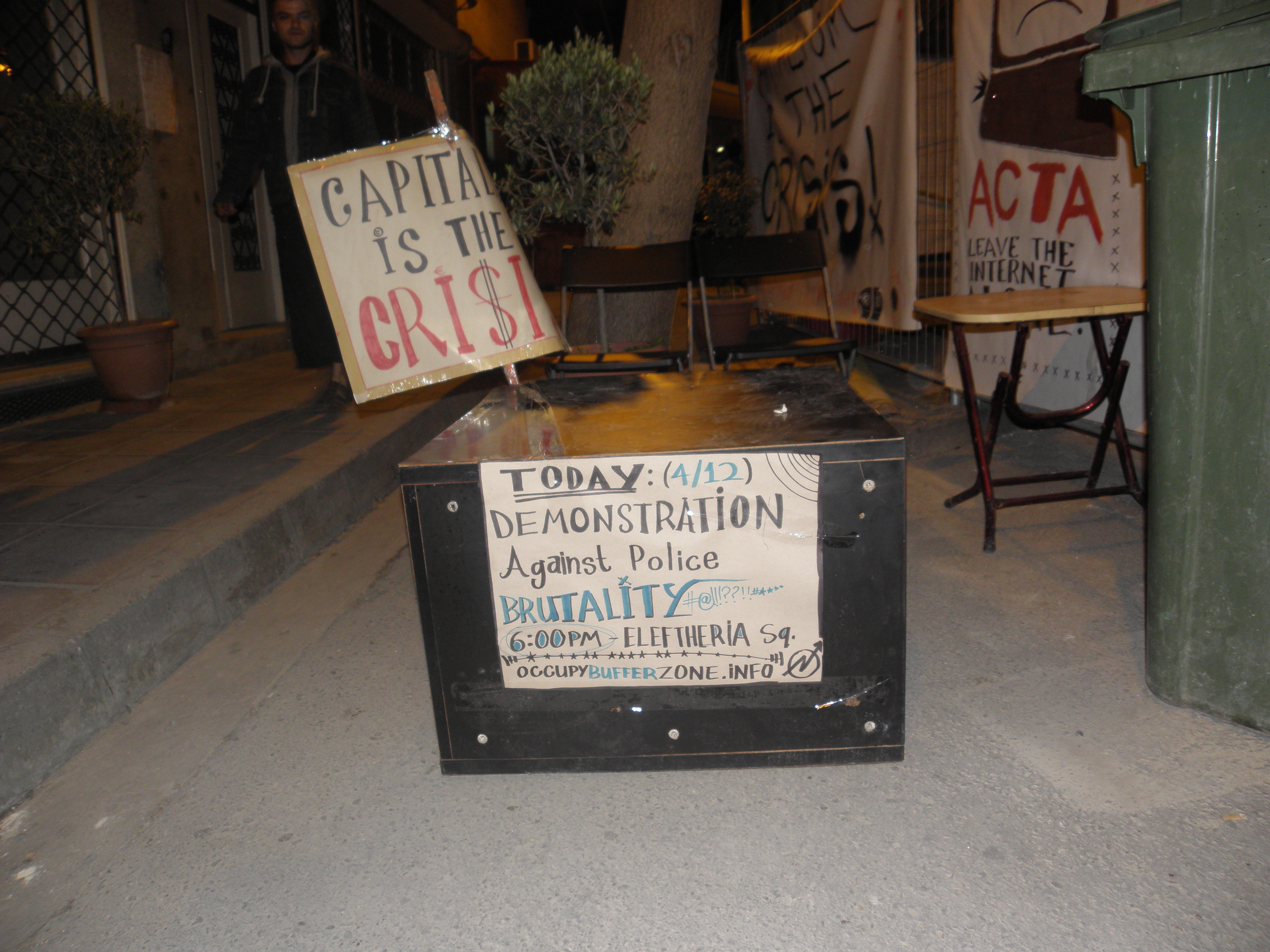
Stand at Occupy Buffer Zone on 12 April 2012, used to inform passers by earlier in the day for the demonstration against the police raid of the movement.

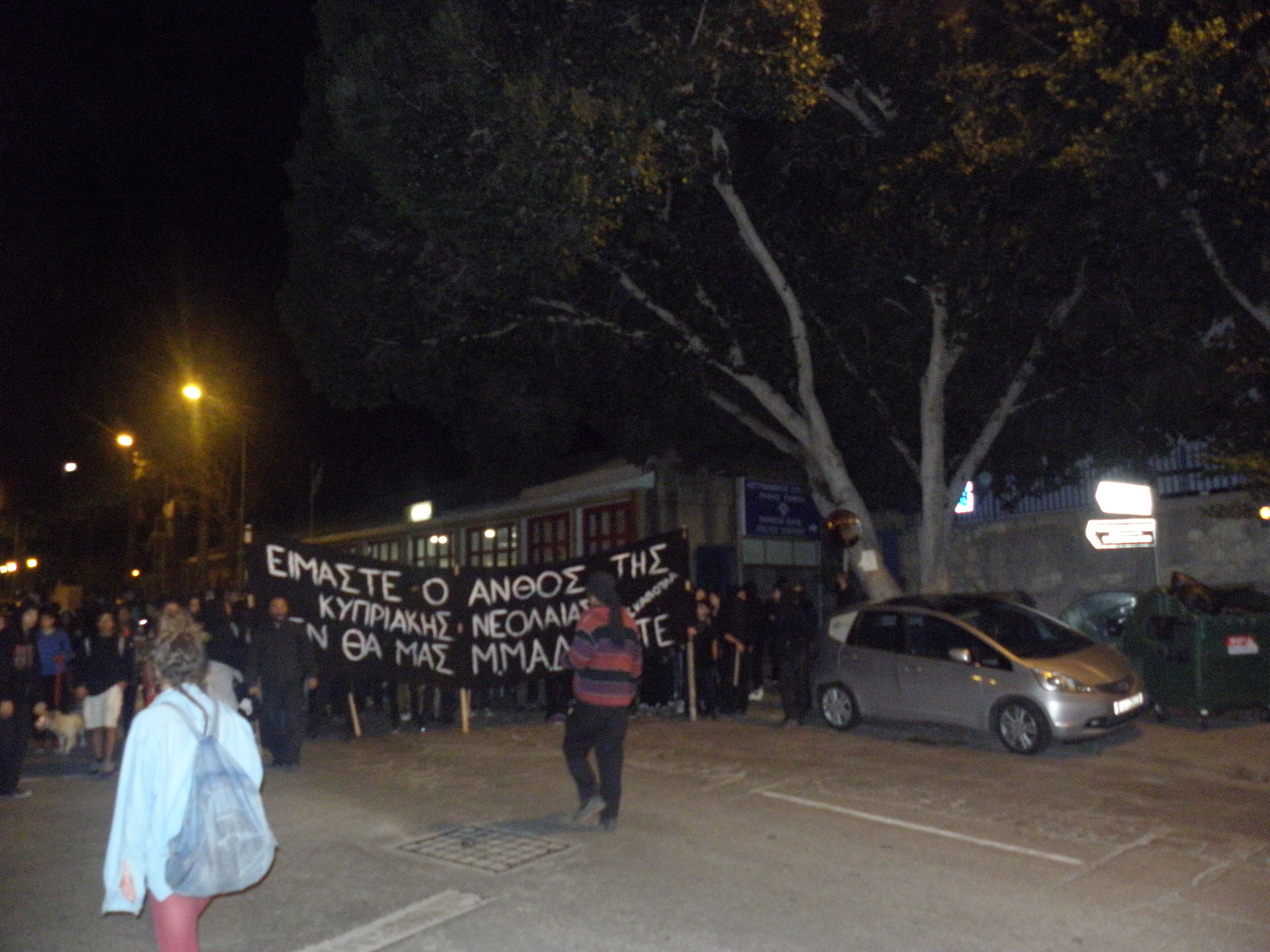
The demonstration against the police raid organised by Skapoula student magazine, passing outside Pafos Gate police station in Nicosia. The activists arrested in the raid were taken to this station a week before.

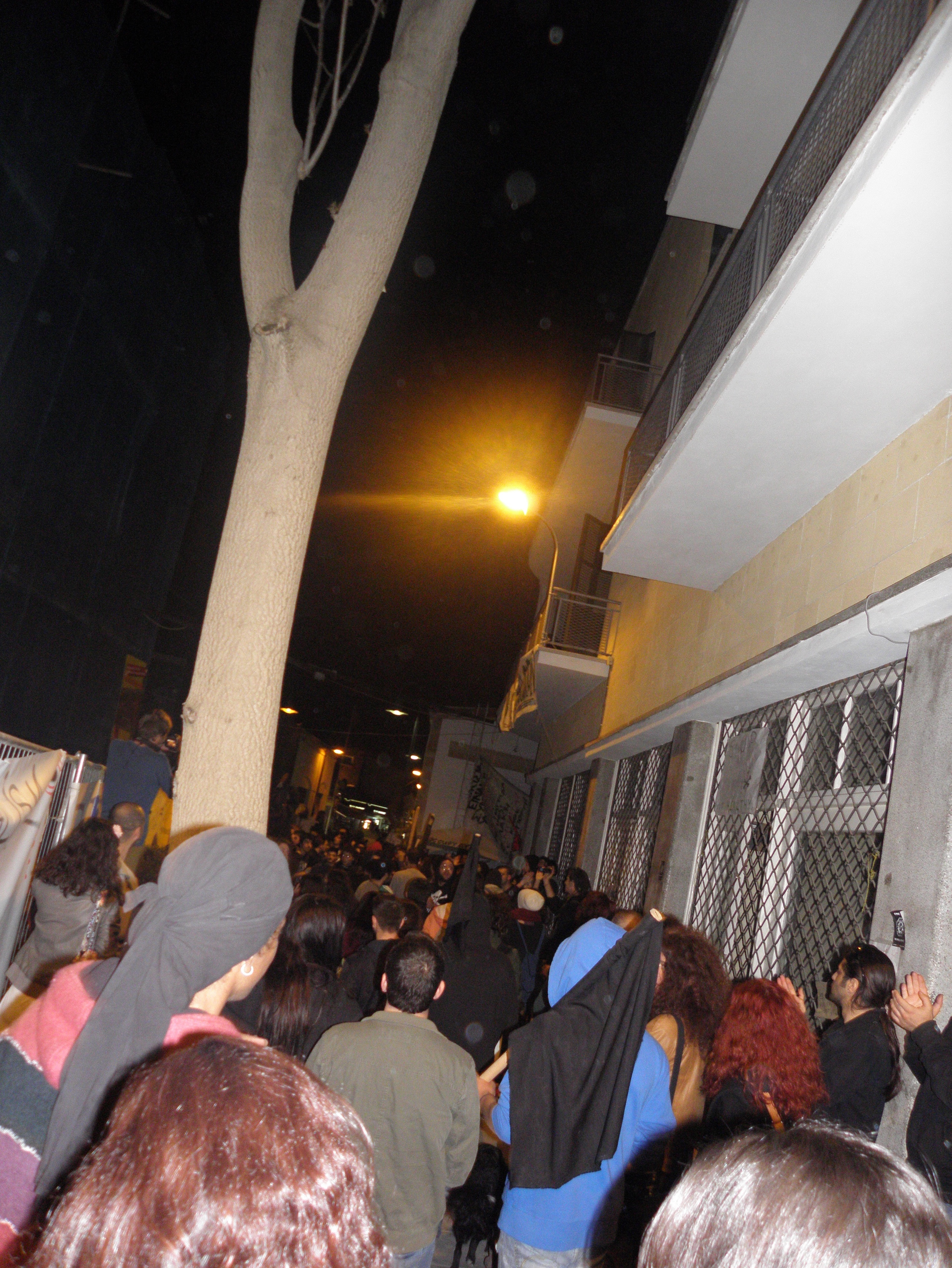
The buffer zone reoccupied at the end of the march against the police raid on 12 April 2012.

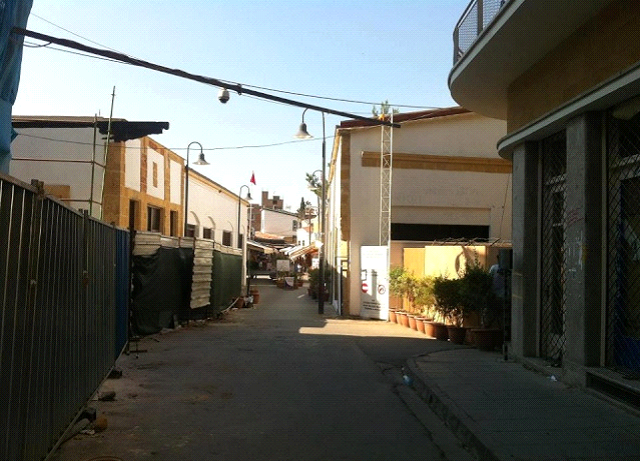
The buffer zone as seen in June 2012. Barbed wire is seen over the space used by the protesters during the last weeks of the occupation.
