= Cyprus Joint Rescue Coordination Center =

- Κέντρο Συντονισμού Έρευνας και Διάσωσης

JRCC Larnaca overview
- Formed: 7 August 1995; 31 years ago
- Jurisdiction: Nicosia FIR
- Headquarters: Larnaca, Cyprus
- Motto: ΘΑΡΣΕΙ ΚΙΝΔΥΝΕΥΟΥΣΙ ΒΟΗΘΕΙΝ
- Ministers responsible: Mr. Vasilis Palmas, Minister of Defence; Mr. Alexis Vafeades, Minister of Communications & Works
- JRCC Larnaca executives: Lieutenant Commander (Navy) George Economou, JRCC Commander; Costas Fitiris, Former JRCC Commander (2010–2018)
- Website: www.jrcc-cyprus.mod.gov.cy

The Cyprus Joint Rescue Coordination Center or JRCC Larnaca (Greek: Κέντρο Συντονισμού Έρευνας και Διάσωσης) is an independent agency of the Ministry of Defence of the Republic of Cyprus and its primary mission is to organize the national Search and Rescue (SAR) system, to co-ordinate, to control and direct SAR operations in the region that the Cyprus JRCC is responsible for (which coincides with the Nicosia FIR), so that people, whose lives are at risk as a result of aviation or maritime accidents, can be located and rescued in the least amount of time.

This is achieved by coordinating all the different agencies involved such as, Cyprus Police (Including Port and Marine Police, Cyprus Fire Service and Cyprus Police Aviation Unit), the Cypriot National Guard, the Cyprus Civil Defence and other secondary Units, acting as a communications agent between them, so that they do not conduct overlapping searches and waste time by searching areas already searched by other units and in general help all the different units operate as a single larger in numbers unit, eliminating any other problems that might occur.

It is under the operational control of the Minister of Defence and it is staffed by qualified personnel of the Cyprus National Guard, mainly from the branches of the Navy and the Air Force and with all logistic and technical support is the responsibility of the Ministry of Communications & Works.

Τhe Joint Rescue Coordination Center is located in the city of Larnaca in a new owned building near Larnaca Airport.

== History ==
The Cyprus Joint Rescue Coordination Center was established by Law 5(III)/94 and started operating on a trial 24-hour basis on the 7th of August 1995 as an independent unit of the Cyprus Air Force Command.
On March 1, 2002 by decision of the Ministry Cabinet the JRCC undertook formally the responsibility for organizing, coordinating and monitoring, search and rescue operations, in the region that the Republic of Cyprus is responsible for.
The JRCC functioned as such until the 26th of July, 2010. Following the relevant opinion of Attorney General for the provisions of Law 5 (III) / 1994 (on Research - Rescue Ratification Act) JRCC reports directly to the Minister of Defence and operates as an independent agency of the Ministry of Defence.

== 2023 Sudan crisis ==
The JRCC haδ played a pivotal role for incoming Britons who were evacuated from Sudan by Royal Air Force during the 2023 conflict in processing them and giving them temporary accommodation in the Republic of Cyprus under the national "ESTIA" plan until they were moved to RAF Akrotiri and repatriated to the United Kingdom. The Cypriot authorities were thanked for their help by the Secretary of State for Defence, Ben Wallace and later the British High Commissioner to Cyprus, Irfan Siddiq. It also played a role in helping the evacuation and subsequent repatratiation of French and American citizens.

== Amalthea initiative ==
As a result of the Gaza war which re-erupted on October 7 after a Hamas-led terrorist attack on Israel, due to the offensive in Gaza, it had become increasingly difficult to get aid into Palestinian territories. As such, the Cypriot government proposed the Amalthea initiative, which was aid, starting from Larnaca port being sent to Gaza by sea. The operational concept of the corridor was designed inside JRCC Larnaca by then commander Costas Fitiris, who has been described as one of the architects of the national SAR plans and of Amalthea itself.

After weeks of planning, it was approved by the European Union, the United States and the UAE and began sending aid, with the first ship arriving on March 17. Both Ursula von der Leyen and Roberta Metsola visited the JRCC and thanked them for their work in co-ordinating the initiative.

== Training activities ==
The JRCC is also responsible for training and advising other countries on their Search and Rescue skills and plans. In August 2024 the JRCC signed an agreement with Lebanon in order to train its staff on search and rescue procedures and begun training their staff from July 30 to August 2.

== Notable commanders ==
- Costas Fitiris, retired rear admiral of the Cyprus Navy, former commander of JRCC Larnaca and of the Underwater Demolition Command (ΟΥΚ), credited with a key role in the design of national search-and-rescue plans such as Τεύκρος and Αμάλθεια. Since December 2025 he has served as Minister of Justice and Public Order of the Republic of Cyprus.

== Cyprus search and rescue region (SRR) ==
The Cyprus search and rescue region (SRR) coincides with the Nicosia FIR as described in the current Air Navigation Plan of the International Civil Aviation Organization (ICAO).

== Distress frequencies ==
The internationally established frequencies to be used for Distress and Safety and monitored by Search and Rescue are:

- 518 kHz NAVTEX (Maritime safety information)
- 121.5 MHz International civil aviation distress frequency
- 243.0 MHz International military aviation distress frequency
- 156.8 MHz (CH-16) International maritime call and distress frequency
- 156.525 MHz (CH-70)
- 2187.5 kHz
- 4207.5 kHz
- 6312.0 kHz
- 8414.5 kHz
- 12577.0 kHz
- 16804.5 kHz
- 2182 kHz International maritime call and distress frequency on MF
- 406.025 MHz Transmission frequency of EPIRB, ELT and PLB of the COSPAS-SARSAT satellite system

JRCC Larnaca maintains continued monitoring of the following frequencies:

- 121.5 MHz VHF/AM
- 134.0 MHz VHF/AM (Common of Initial Contact with JRCC)
- 243.0 MHz UHF/AM
- 255.0 MHz UHF/AM (Common of Initial Contact with JRCC)
- 156.8 MHz (CH-16) VHF/FM
- 2182 kHz MF/HF

The DSC frequencies mentioned above are monitored by Cyprus Coast Station (Cyprus Radio)

- 518 kHz NAVTEX

Note that: JRCC uses the NATO phonetic alphabet for communicating characters in English and the standard Greek phonetic alphabet (Ελληνικό φωνητικό αλφάβητο) for communicating characters in Greek.

== See also ==
- Cypriot National Guard
- Cyprus Air Forces
- Cyprus Civil Defence
- Cyprus Fire Service
- Cyprus Navy
- Cyprus Police
- Cyprus Police Aviation Unit
- Cyprus Port & Marine Police
