= Utility helicopter =

General purpose helicopter

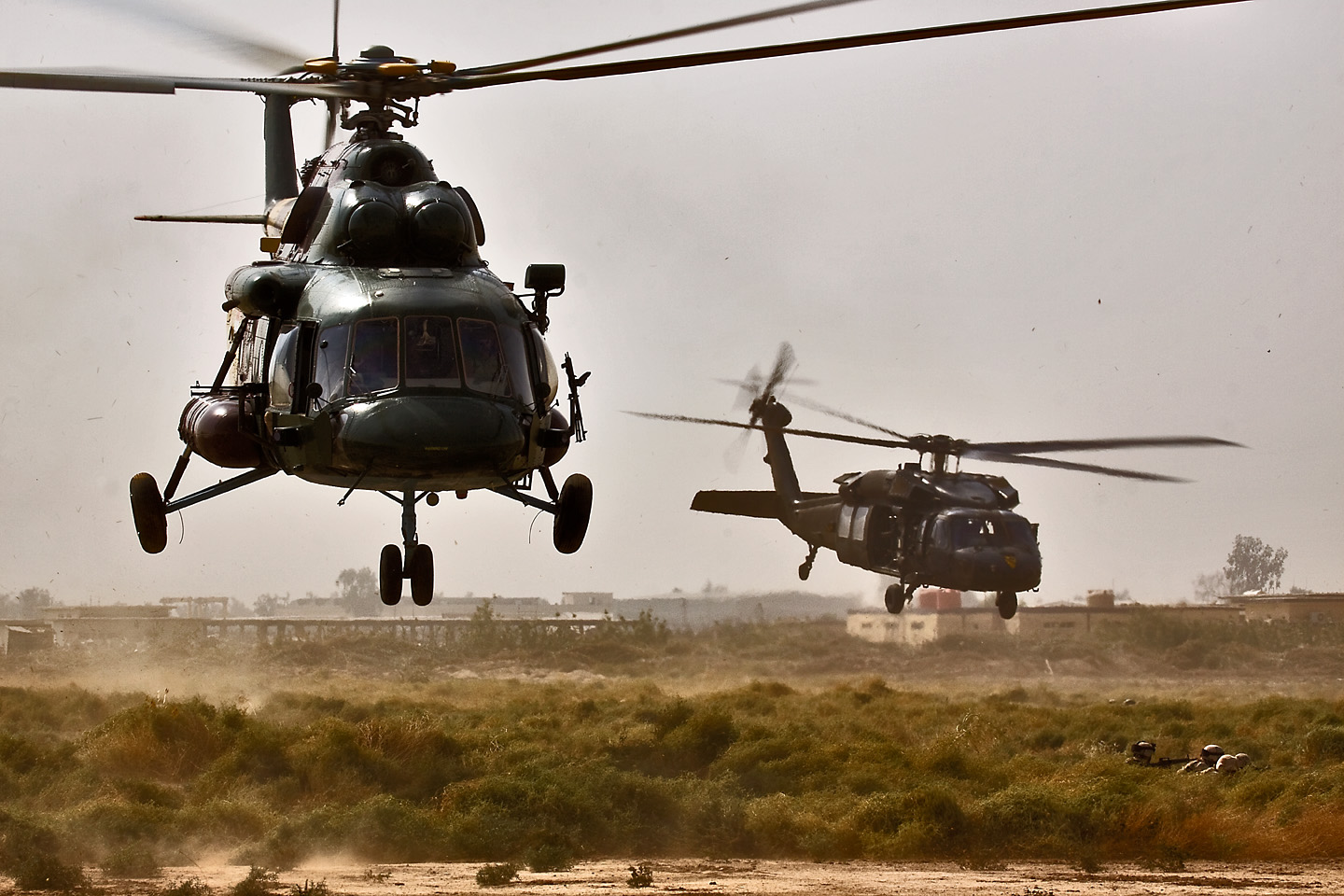
A Mil Mi-17 of the Iraqi Air Force conducts an operation alongside a Sikorsky UH-60 Black Hawk of the U.S. Army. They are among the most popular utility helicopters among military forces worldwide.

A utility helicopter is a multi-purpose helicopter capable of pursuing a wide array of tasks. They have proven useful in both civilian and military operations, with versatility being their defining trait.

== Civilian ==
Helicopters play a crucial role in various aspects of civilian safety. Police and fire rescue aircraft demonstrate exceptional versatility across a broad spectrum of tasks. Common applications for civilian utility include traffic surveillance, medical evacuations, news coverage, and search and rescue missions. Recently, usage has been extended to air evacuations, air and water pollution control, emergency cargo transportation (including blood, organs, and special equipment), and as helitankers in aerial firefighting.

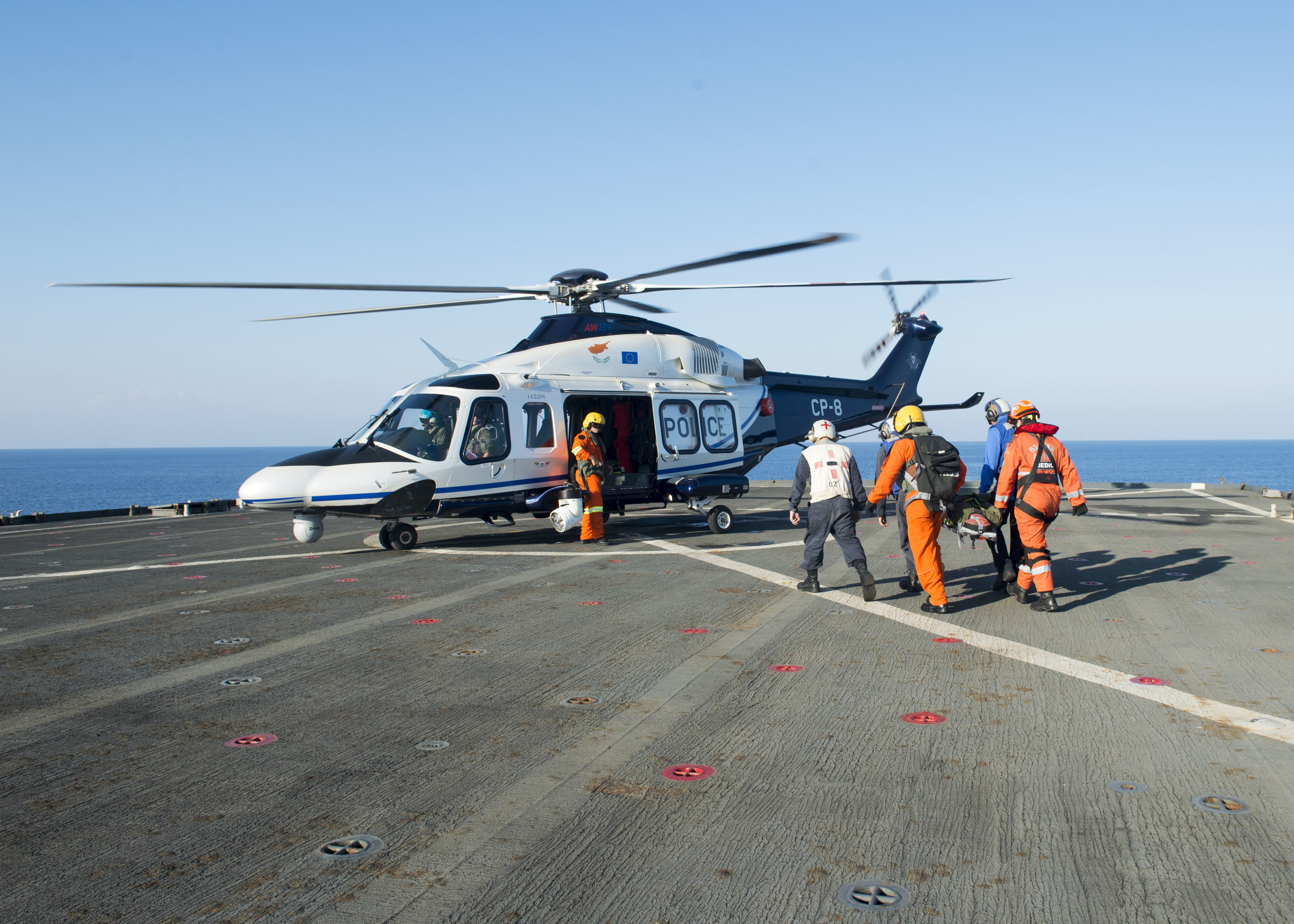
An AW139 utility helicopter from Cyprus Police Aviation Unit conducting a search and rescue exercise.

Traditionally, helicopters with three placed reciprocating engines, such as the 47G Series and the Hughes 300C were the primary choices for civilian use. However, the preference has been shifted towards turbine engines. The FH-100 and the Bell 206A JetRanger are examples of turbine engine helicopters which have proven to be more effective in operational scenarios.

The arising issue with civilian use helicopters is the price tag of the turbine engine helicopters. With initial cost being around $100,000, difficulties are posed when budgeting for the necessary modifications. Such modifications include night vision capabilities, infrared, and radar.

== Military ==
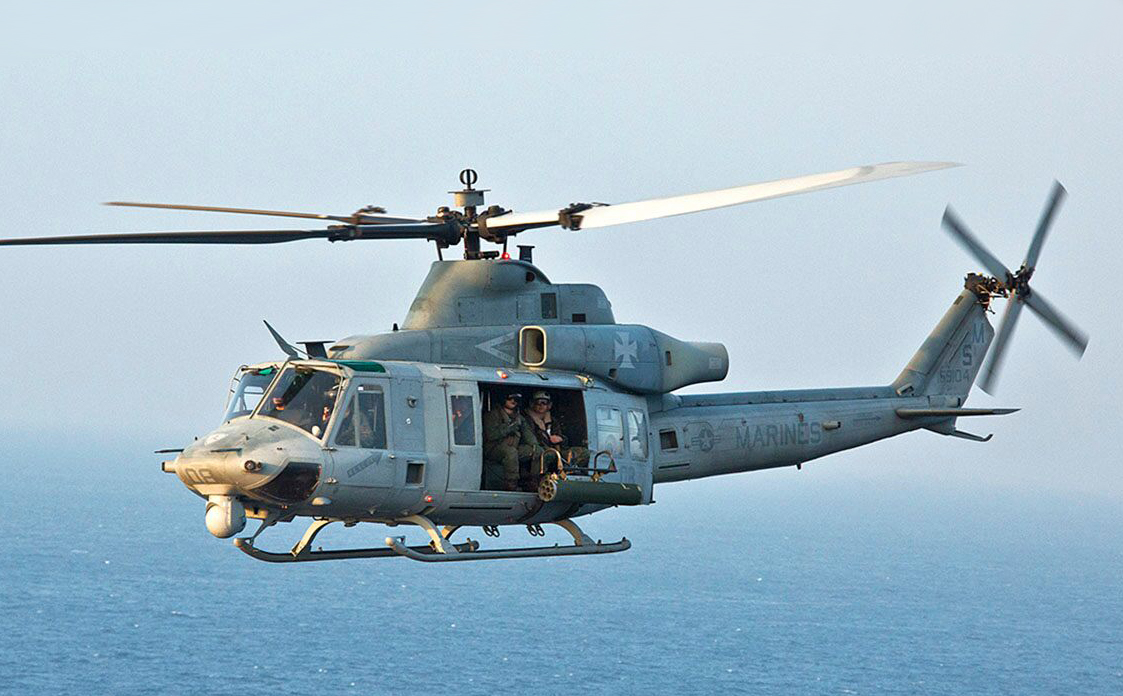
This Bell UH-1Y is equipped with a FLIR and rocket pods, demonstrating its versatility as a utility helicopter

In military terms, a utility helicopter is an aircraft designed to transport troops, but is versatile in performing various combat roles. These tasks include command and control, logistics, casualty evacuation, and fire support. The defining characteristics of these helicopters are lightweight frames capable of quick maneuvers, and space, for transporting troops and cargo. Common types of cargo include ammunition, weapons, and food.

These aircraft play a crucial role in military operations by providing defensive capabilities in scenarios of evacuation and cargo transportation, as well as offensive roles in fire support and surveillance. Their ability to adapt to different mission requirements contributes significantly to the success of military objectives.

== See also ==
- Cargo hook (helicopter)
- Ground proximity warning system
- Utility aircraft
