= Government of Cyprus =

Government of the Republic of Cyprus

Overview
- Leader: President
- Leader Name: Nikos Christodoulides
- Main organ: Council of Ministers
- Ministries: 11 Ministries; 8 Deputy Ministries
- Headquarters: Presidential Palace

Government of Cyprus (Greek: Κυπριακή Κυβέρνηση), officially the Government of Cyprus, exercises executive power in Cyprus. It is composed of the President, who is the head of government, as well as his ministers (Cabinet).

The Council of Ministers, the main executive organ of the government, was established in the Constitution in 1960. Its members meet at the Presidential Palace in Nicosia. The meetings are presided over by the President of Cypus who is also the head of state.

== Council of Ministers ==
The Council of Ministers is an independent body that serves as the main authority for exercising executive power in Cyprus. They are appointed by the President of the Republic under Article 46 of the Constitution, the Council handles executive matters (Policy etc.) under the direction of the President.

Under Article 54, the Council is responsible for the general direction and control of the government, as well as shaping its overall policy with its core responsibilities include managing Foreign affairs, national defense and security. It also coordinates and supervises public services, manages property belonging to the Republic, and reviews Bills and the National Budget before they are introduced to the House of Representatives.

Meetings are convened by the President, who sets the agenda. Decisions are made by a majority, typically during plenary sessions, though specialized Ad Hoc Ministerial Committees can be formed for specific issues. Under Article 57, the President holds the right to veto or return decisions related to foreign affairs, defense, or security for reconsideration.

Currently, the Council consists of 11 Ministries. This is a slight expansion from the original Ministries established during a Transitional Committee meeting in March 1959, prior to the country's official independence.

== National Security Council ==
The National Security Council (NSC) of Cyprus operates under the Presidency of the Republic of Cyprus and is a relatively new governmental body. It was established in April 2023 President Nikos Christodoulides, following through on a campaign promise. It was established as an inter-agency, governmental advisory body led by the President, and was created to fill a long-standing need for better coordination among public services regarding national security and defense, acting as a hub for assessing security threats and risks, and creating long-term strategic plans.

The core responsibilities of the Cyprus National Security Council include advising the President and the National Council on all matters pertaining to national security and submitting relevant observations, suggestions, or alternative proposals. Furthermore, the Council is tasked with issuing the National Security Strategy (NSS) upon receiving approval from the Council of Ministers, and subsequently monitoring its ongoing implementation. Finally, the NSC is responsible for coordinating international relations and developing cooperative ties with similar security bodies in other states.

== Ministries ==
11 Core Ministries:

- Ministry of Foreign Affairs
- Ministry of Finance
- Ministry of Interior
- Ministry of Defense
- Ministry of Education, Sport and Youth
- Ministry of Transport, Communications and Works
- Ministry of Energy, Commerce and Industry
- Ministry of Agriculture, Rural Development and Environment
- Ministry of Labour and Social Insurance
- Ministry of Justice and Public Order
- Ministry of Health

8 Deputy Ministries

- Deputy Ministry to the President
- Deputy Ministry of Shipping
- Deputy Ministry of Tourism
- Deputy Ministry of Research, Innovation and Digital Policy
- Deputy Ministry of Social Welfare
- Deputy Ministry of Culture
- Deputy Ministry of European Affairs
- Migration and International Protection
