= Cyprus Police Aviation Unit =

- Μονάδα Αεροπορικών Επιχειρήσεων (Greek)
- Active: 10 June 2008 - present
- Country: Cyprus
- Agency: Cyprus Police
- Headquarters: Larnaca International Airport
- Abbreviation: CPAU

Equipment
- Aircraft: 1 Islander BN-2T; 1 Bell 412SP; 1 Bell 412EP; 2 AW139

Website
- Official website

The Cyprus Police Aviation Unit (CPAU) (Greek: Μονάδα Αεροπορικών Επιχειρήσεων (Μ.Α.ΕΠ.), is the police aviation unit of the Headquarters of Cyprus Police, the national police of the Republic of Cyprus and was established on 10 June 2008, having previously operated as the Cyprus Police Air Wing (from 1990 to 9.6.2008).

== Mission ==
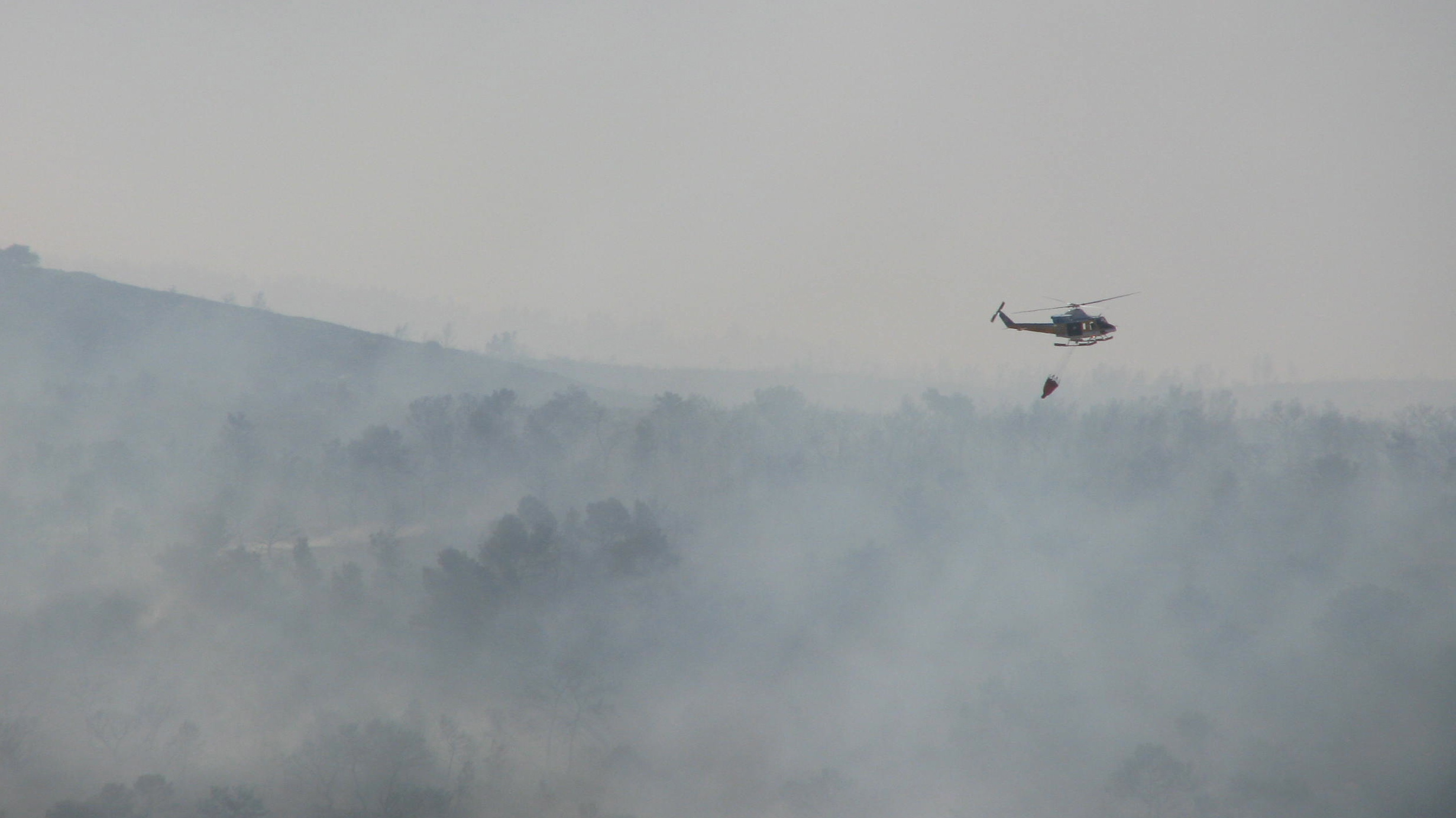
Cypriot Police Bell 412EP participating in fire fighting efforts in Israel, during the 2010 Mount Carmel forest fire

The mission of the CPAU is as follows:

1. Surveillance of the coast and of the territorial limits of the Republic of Cyprus, as well as the patrol of the Nicosia FIR (Flight Information Region) in cooperation with other units, with the aim of preventing drug trafficking, illegal immigration and terrorism.
2. Supervision and surveillance of the highways and main roads.
3. Search and Rescue missions aiming at saving lives and property in the case of naval or aviation accidents that occur within the Nicosia FIR.
4. Transport of patients or injured persons to a suitable medical center in Cyprus
5. Fire fighting and support of other fire fighting units
6. Location of exhibits under water with the support of C.P.A.U. divers
7. Transport of Police members and other government personnel on special missions
8. Transport of high-level government officials and VIPs.
9. Escort of motor convoys with high-level officials and VIPs.
10. Execution of any missions which are assigned to the C.P.A.U. by the Cyprus Joint Rescue Coordination Center (JRCC).
11. Execution of any other duties, which are requested by the Chief of Police.

== Fleet ==
List of Aerial Vehicles used by Cyprus Police (past and present)
Year entered service	Type	Photo	Manufacturer	Production Model	Registration	Purpose	Notes
1990	Airplane		(United Kingdom) Britten-Norman	ISLANDER BN-2T	CP-1		
1990	Helicopter		(United States) Bell Helicopter	Bell 412SP	CP-2		
1996	Helicopter		(United States) Bell Helicopter	Bell 412EP	CP-4		
2011	Helicopter		(Italy) AgustaWestland	AgustaWestland AW139	CP-6		
2011	Helicopter		(Italy) AgustaWestland	AgustaWestland AW139	CP-8		

=== Timeline ===
In November 2012 the Britten-Norman Islander was sold for 75,000 euros along with its spare parts for another 75,000 euros although a Police report was suggesting that the plane should be repaired for 250,000 euros.

In December 2013 the Minister of Justice and Public Order, Mr. Ionas Nicolaou, ordered an investigation on the sale of the Britten-Norman Islander, after it was discovered that although the plane was deemed unsuitable to fly for more than 40 hours, it actually flew from Cyprus to Finland, where the buyer was located, and was now on sale for 750,000 euros by the new owner after it was repaired.

In 2015 the two Bell helicopters were sent to be repainted to the new blue and white color scheme to replace the older yellow, light blue and white color scheme that they were painted. This new blue and white color scheme is the same that the Augusta Westland helicopters were painted when they were first received.

== See also ==
Cyprus Agencies related topics:

- Cyprus Air Forces
- Cyprus Civil Defence
- Cyprus Fire Service
- Cyprus Joint Rescue Coordination Center
- Cyprus Police
- Cyprus Port & Marine Police

Cyprus Police Aviation Unit Mission related topics:

- Helicopter bucket
- Helitack
- Medical evacuation
- Police aviation
- Ethiopian Airlines Flight 409
