= Ministry of Interior (Cyprus) =

Government ministry of Cyprus

- Υπουργείο Εσωτερικών

Ministry overview
- Formed: 16 August 1960; 65 years ago
- Jurisdiction: Government of Cyprus
- Headquarters: Archigrammateias St., Nicosia
- Minister responsible: Constantinos Ioannou, Minister of Interior
- Ministry executive: Elikkos Elia, Permanent Secretary
- Website: gov.cy

Ministry of Interior (Greek: Υπουργείο Εσωτερικών) is the interior ministry of Cyprus. It is headquartered in Nicosia.

== Organisation ==
=== Departments ===
- Department of Lands and Surveys
- Department of Town Planning and Housing
- Press and Information Office
- Civil Defense

Semi government and other organisations:

- Cyprus Broadcasting Corporation (CyBC)
- Cyprus News Agency (CNA)
- Cyprus Land Development Corporation (CLDC)
- Cyprus Radiotelevision Authority (CRTA)
- Town Planning Council

=== Directorates ===
- Directorate of Policy, European Affairs and Human Resources
- Directorate of Civil Registry and Elections
- Directorate of Technical Services
- European Funds Directorate

== See also ==
- List of ministers of interior of Cyprus
