= Cyprus Police Museum =

Coordinates: 35.144640°N 33.374230°E

- Μουσείο Αστυνομίας Κύπρου; Kıbrıs Polis Müzesi
- Established: 1933
- Location: Evangelou Floraki Street, (within the grounds of the Police Headquarters), Nicosia, Cyprus
- Type: Specialized museum
- Website: http://www.police.gov.cy/

The Cyprus Police Museum is a museum in Cyprus, dedicated to the history of law enforcement in the country. It is owned by the Cyprus Police and managed by Department A' of the Police Headquarters.

The Police Museum is open to the public from Monday to Friday between 0900-1300 and does not charge admission.

== History ==
The Cyprus Police Museum was founded in 1933 during the British Colonial Period (1878–1959). The then British Chief of Police of the colonial government, W.C.C. King sent a circular to all Divisional Police Headquarters announcing the founding of the Police Museum, then known as the Criminal Museum, requesting that all responsible officers of the Criminal Investigation Departments (C.I.D.) of each district send any unusual criminal samples, samples relating to serious cases or interesting items that are suitable for exhibit at the museum, to the Police Headquarters.

Initially the Police Museum was housed at the Criminal Investigation Department at the Police Headquarters. In 1951 it was moved to the then Police Training School in Strovolos and was moved again in 1975 to the Police Premises in Athalassa near the Police Headquarters. Since December 2004 it functions in a house built during the British Colonial Period which was used as a police residence for several decades. In 2003 the house was specially transformed and enlarged to meet the needs of the museum after a directive by the then Chief of Police Mr. Tasos Panayiotou so that it could house a richer collection of exhibits regarding the functioning of the police as well as displays of wider historic interest that could be visited by the public.

From the time it opened until 2003 the Police Museum was visited exclusively by students of the then Police Training School and more recently the Police Academy as part of their training. Now it is open to the public without charging admission.

== Exhibits ==
=== Police related ===
A substantial part of the Museum is dedicated to the history of the Cyprus Police, with exhibits dating back to the early years of the British period up to the present times. The visitor can view police arms, uniforms and other police equipment, along with police vehicles, musical instruments of the Police Band, records and documents.

=== Crime related ===
A section on shocking crimes and notorious criminals exists in the Museum where it houses, amongst others, weapons, photographs, and various other items from serious crimes of the past, that shook the society of Cyprus, as well as items and records regarding notorious outlaws.

Moreover, the visitor can discover interesting aspects concerning the development and the detection of crime in Cyprus throughout the decades.

=== Modern History of Cyprus ===
Apart from the purely police-related and crime-related exhibits, the Museum also houses some very interesting items and documents from important periods of the modern history of Cyprus, including the 1955 - 1959 anti-colonial Struggle and World War II.

== See also ==
- Cyprus Port & Marine Police
