= Cyprus Police =

Cyprus Police Greek: Αστυνομία Κύπρου Turkish: Kıbrıs Polisi
- Cyprus police logo
- Motto: Ανθρώπινη και Υπερήφανη (Humane and Proud)

Agency overview
- Formed: 1960

Jurisdictional structure
- National agency: CY
- Operations jurisdiction: CY
- Above: Districts of Cyprus. Note that the northern part of the island is currently not policed by the Cyprus Police as it is under the de facto control of the Turkish Republic of Northern Cyprus. The area in bright contrasting colour is the UN Buffer Zone and in grey are the areas of the British Sovereign Bases. Below: Relief map of Cyprus showing mountains and sea. The red dot indicates the capital and the Headquarters location.
- Area: 9,251 km^{2} total Areas Cyprus Police does not operate in 3,355 km^{2} occupied area (North); 346km² UN buffer zone 254km² British Sovereign Bases
- Population: 956,000
- Primary governing body: Republic of Cyprus
- Secondary governing body: Ministry of Justice and Public Order (Cyprus)
- Constituting instruments: The Constitution of the Republic of Cyprus; Police Law 73(I)2004; Criminal Code Cap.154; Criminal Procedure Law Cap.155; Evidence Law Cap-9; The Processing of Personal Data (Protection of the Individual) Law 138(1)/2001
- General nature: Civilian police

Operational structure
- Overseen by Government Agency: Independent Authority for the Investigation of Allegations and Complaints against the Police
- Headquarters: Antistratigou Evaggelou Floraki Str., Aglantzia, Nicosia, Cyprus
- Police officers: 5167 (as of 2024)
- Specialized posts: 92
- Minister responsible: Constantinos Fitiris
- Agency executive: Themistos Arnaoutis, Chief of Police

Facilities
- Police stations: 50 excluding substations, offices, units etc.
- Airbases: 1
- Boats: 5 fast sea patrol boats 5 patrol boats 6 rigid inflatable boats
- Helicopters: 2 Bell 412EP; 2 AgustaWestland AW139

Website
- http://www.police.gov.cy/
- Emergency Telephone Number 112 or 199; Citizens' line 1460; Narcotics line 1498; Hunters' line 1414; Fire report line 1407; Rescue Coordination Center 1441

The Cyprus Police (Greek: Αστυνομία Κύπρου, Turkish: Kıbrıs Polisi), is the national police service of the Republic of Cyprus, falling under the Ministry of Justice and Public Order since 1993.

The duties and responsibilities of the Cyprus police are set out in the amended Police Law (N.73(1)) of 2004 and include the maintenance of law and order, the prevention and detection of crime, as well as arresting and bringing offenders to justice.

== History ==
Although the history of Law enforcement in Cyprus goes back to 1879 when the first Police Law was passed by the then British Colonial Government, which operated a mounted gendarmerie force known as the Cyprus Military Police, the history of the Cyprus Police begins with the establishment of the Republic of Cyprus in 1960.

In 1960 two Public Security Forces were established within the framework of the Constitution: the Police Force, which was responsible for policing the urban areas, and the Gendarmerie, which was responsible for policing rural areas. A Greek-Cypriot Chief and a Turkish-Cypriot Chief administered the two Forces respectively.

The two forces of the police were joined to form the present police service during the year 1964, shortly after the intercommunal troubles between the Greek and the Turkish communities, as a result of which the Turkish Cypriot officers abandoned their posts. Additionally the conflict created great problems for the police, who had to handle the situation, along with the then sparsely manned Cypriot Army, because it was the only organized force.

With the creation of the Cypriot National Guard in 1964, the duties of military nature were transferred to the National Guard and the police was limited back to its usual duties.

Also notable is that a museum dedicated to the history of the Cyprus Police and Law enforcement in Cyprus in general exists, with a history of its own. The Cyprus Police Museum, owned by the Cyprus Police and managed by the Department A' of the Police Headquarters is open to the general public.

== Authorities ==
The Cyprus Police operates and exercises its authorities throughout the territory of the Republic of Cyprus based on the following Laws and Regulations:

- The Constitution of the Republic of Cyprus
- Police Law (N.73(I)/2004)
- Police Regulations
- Police Standing Orders
- Criminal Code Cap.154
- Criminal Procedure Law Cap.155
- Evidence Law Cap-9
- The Processing of Personal Data (Protection of the Individual) Law 138(1)/2001

The legal framework within which the Cyprus Police exists and operates is determined by the Constitution, Police Law Cap.285 and other laws that provide the authority for investigation, detention, arrest, questioning and prosecution of offenders of the Law.

== Structure and organisation ==
The structure and organisation of the Cyprus Police is governed by Police Ordinance 1/10 and is formed as stated below:

=== Headquarters ===
The Police Headquarters is divided into different Departments/Directorates/Services and Units, each specializing in a different field/aspect of policing.

==== Departments ====
- Department A' (Administration)
- Department B' (Traffic, Transport)
- Department C' (Criminal Investigations, Prosecutors)
- Department D' (Scientific & Technical Support)
- Research and Development Department

==== Directorates ====
- European Union & International Police Cooperation Directorate
- Materials & Supplies Management Directorate
- Airports Security Directorate
- Finance Directorate
- Directorate of Professional Standards

==== Services ====
- Aliens & Immigration Service
- Drug Law Enforcement Service
- Forensic Investigations Service
- Audit & Inspection Service
- Central Intelligence Service

==== Units ====
- Cyprus Police Academy
- Emergency Response Unit
- Presidential Guard Unit
- Port & Marine Police
- Cyprus Police Aviation Unit (Previously named Police Air Wing)

=== Divisions ===
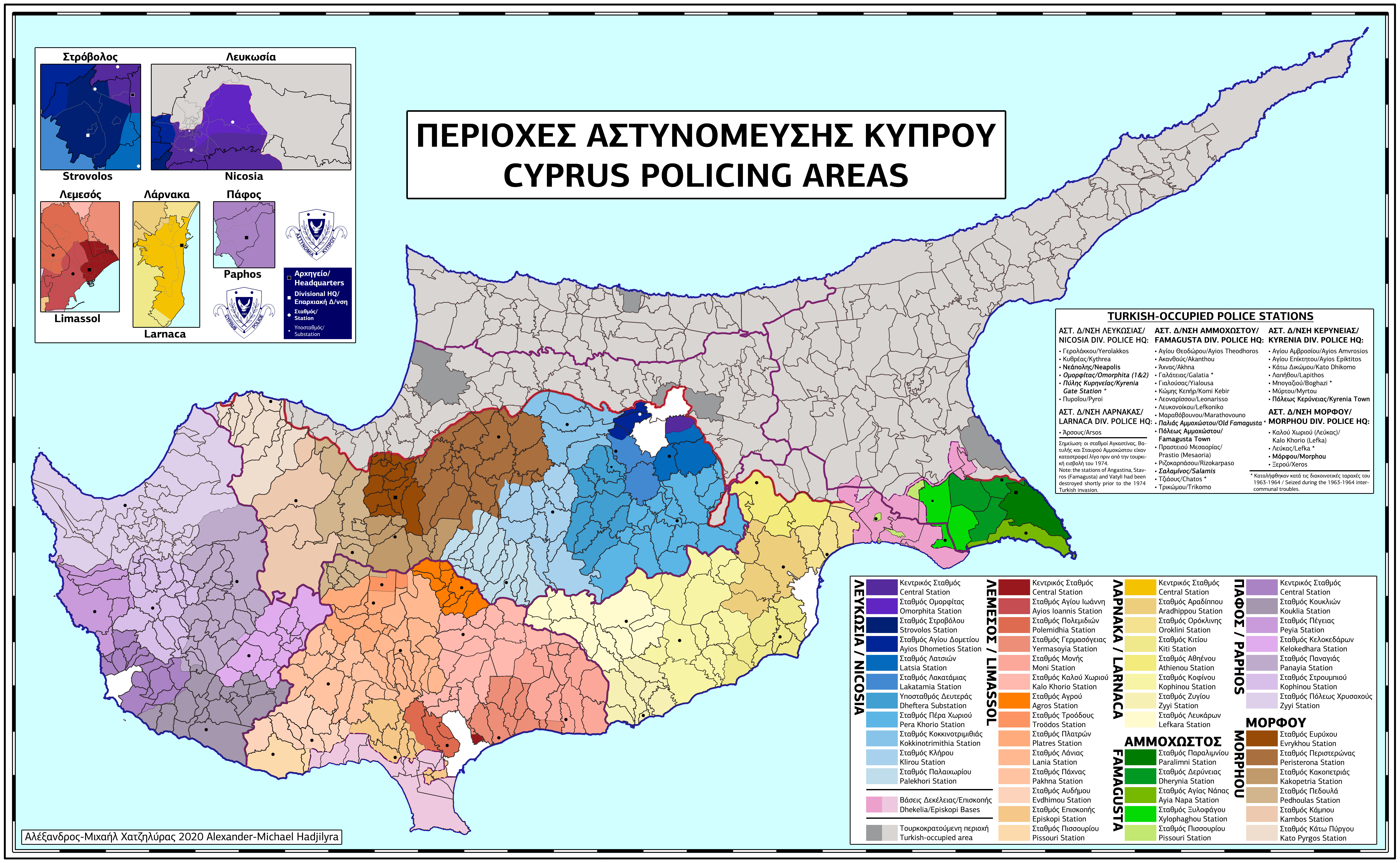
Policing areas of Cyprus

The Cyprus Police has one Division for each district of Cyprus. Under this divisions are the Police Stations but also within each Police Division, branches can be created similar to the branches of the Police Headquarters. For example, there is a Headquarters Drug Law Enforcement Service but also a Nicosia, Limassol etc. Drug Law Enforcement Service. Other examples include Headquarters Criminal Investigation Department (C.I.D.)- Larnaca, Nicosia, Limassol etc. C.I.D. and Headquarters Traffic Department - Nicosia, Limassol etc. Traffic Department . The difference is that the Headquarters units/services etc. operate throughout the territory of the Cyprus Republic while the divisional (provincial) units/services operate mostly within the District that are located.

- Nicosia
- Limassol
- Larnaca
- Famagusta
- Paphos
- Keryneia
- Morphou
- Fire Service - The Fire Service used to operate as an independent Division based in Nicosia but with national coverage up to 15/10/2021 that was established as an independent service.

Because of the Turkish invasion and continuing occupation, the Police Divisional Headquarters of Famagusta and Morphou are temporarily housed in Paralimni and Evrychou respectively, while the Kyrenia Police Division has temporarily suspended its operation.

=== Ranks of the Cyprus Police ===
Title	Chief Constable (Αρχηγός)	Deputy Chief Constable (Υπαρχηγός)	Assistant Chief Constable (Βοηθός Αρχηγός)	Chief Superintendent (Ανώτερος Αστυνόμος)	Superintendent A (Αστυνόμος Α)	Superintendent B (Αστυνόμος Β)	Chief Inspector (Ανώτερος Υπαστυνόμος)	Inspector (Υπαστυνόμος)	Senior Sergeant (Αρχιλοχίας)	Sergeant (Λοχίας)	Constable (Αστυφύλακας)	Special constable (Ειδικός Αστυφύλακας)
Insignia												

== Equipment ==
=== Vehicles ===
==== Markings ====
Cyprus Police cars are white with a blue stripe that goes around the car. On both sides they have printed on them the words POLICE and ΑΣΤΥΝΟΜΙΑ, which means Police in Greek. They also have the logo of the Cyprus Police, usually on the front doors and also have printed on them the Police's website www.police.gov.cy. An exception to this is some of the cars used by the Neighbourhood Police that have the Neighbourhood Police logo instead of the Cyprus Police Logo. On the front part of the car they have again the logo with the words POLICE and ΑΣΤΥΝΟΜΙΑ and at the back they could have, depending on the model of the car and the space available, the words Police in Greek and English or just the Cyprus Police insignia or both. On the roof they have printed a distinct number for each one as aerial roof markings.

In 2011 a trial version for new markings was used on an old Opel Vectra patrol car. These were half-Battenburg markings with a highly reflective blue-yellow stripe on the sides instead of the solid blue stripe. Additionally the back was covered in reflective yellow-red diagonal stripes and had printed the emergency phone number 112. The front part on the hood of the car had the words ΑΣΤΥΝΟΜΙΑ and POLICE printed inverted so that they would appear correctly when seen through a mirror. These markings were not enforced.

In 2012 new markings were enforced were the blue stripe although still solid was replaced with a highly reflective one, and the rear horizontal line was replaced from a solid blue stripe to a blue-white diagonal line similar to the rear usually found on vehicles with Battenburg markings.

The Cyprus Police also uses unmarked vehicles. Unmarked vehicles are not necessarily covert to be used for undercover work. Most unmarked cars are the same models as the patrol cars and they are mostly used by plain clothed officers such as crime investigators, crime prevention squads, technicians etc. Most of these cars are fitted with sirens and can be seen in the streets with detachable strobe lights.

==== Lists of vehicles ====
List of vehicles used by Cyprus Police (past and present)
Year entered service^{*}	Vehicle	Photo	Manufacturer	Production Model	Engine	Purpose	Notes
2000	Toyota Landcruiser		(Japan) Toyota		3.0L Diesel	Multi-purpose car	
2001	Opel Vectra		(Germany) Opel		2.6L V6	Multi-purpose car	
	Peugeot 406		(France) Peugeot			Multi-purpose car	
	Renault Laguna		(France) Renault			Multi-purpose car	
	Renault Megane		(France) Renault			Multi-purpose car	
2004	Prinoth Husky		(Italy) Prinoth			Snow Trac	
	Honda CR-V		(Japan) Honda			Multi-purpose car	
	Isuzu Trooper		(Japan) Isuzu			Multi-purpose car	
2007	Mazda3		(Japan) Mazda			Multi-purpose car	
	Peugeot Boxer		(France) Peugeot			Support	
	Ford Transit		(Germany) Ford			Support	
	Renault Trafic		(France) Renault			Support	
	Renault Master		(France) Renault			Support	
	Nissan Pathfinder		(Japan) Nissan		2.5 TD	Multi-purpose car	
	Mitsubishi Pajero		(Japan) Mitsubishi		3.2 Di-D	Multi-purpose car	
2008	Kia Magentis		(South Korea) Kia			Multi-purpose car	
2009	Chevrolet Matiz		(South Korea) Chevrolet			Neighbourhood Police	
	Kia Rio		(South Korea) Kia			Multi-purpose car	
	Isuzu D-Max		(Japan) Isuzu			Support	
	Ford Focus		(Germany) Ford			Multi-purpose car	
2010	Ford Mondeo		(Germany) Ford			Multi-purpose car	
2012	Ford Mondeo		(Germany) Ford			Multi-purpose car	
2025	Mercedes E 450d		(Germany) Mercedes			Multi-purpose car	

^{*}Unless specifically referenced, the dates the vehicles entered service are based on their license plate registration numbers

List of Motorcycles used by Cyprus Police (past and present)
Year entered service^{*}	Motorcycle	Photo	Manufacturer	Production Model	Engine	Purpose	Notes
	Honda CBX750		(Japan) Honda		750cc	Traffic/Response vehicle	
	Suzuki GSX 750P		(Japan) Suzuki		750cc	Traffic/Response vehicle	
	Honda Pan-European		(Japan) Honda		1100cc	Traffic/Response vehicle	
	Suzuki GSX-R1000		(Japan) Suzuki		1000cc	Traffic/Response vehicle	
	Suzuki V-Strom 1000		(Japan) Suzuki		1000cc	Traffic/Response vehicle	
	KTM 640 Adventure		(Austria) KTM		625cc	Traffic/Response vehicle	
	BMW C1		(Germany) BMW			Neighbourhood Police	
	Honda CBR1000RR		(Japan) Honda		1000cc	Traffic/Response vehicle	
	Honda Varadero		(Japan) Honda		1000cc	Traffic/Response vehicle	

^{*}Unless specifically referenced, the dates the vehicles entered service are based on their license plate registration numbers

== In popular culture ==
Cyprus police has been the main feature and appeared in television shows such as:

- "Εσύ Στον Κόσμο Σου", which was a series on ANT1 revolving around a family with the main protagonist being a police officer and showing multiple investigations, mainly organised crime.
- "Στα Όρια" which was a series based on fictional investigations by a team police officers, shown on RIK.
- "Κάρμα" which was a television series on Alpha TV, based on real criminal events that have happened in Cyprus.

== Gallery ==
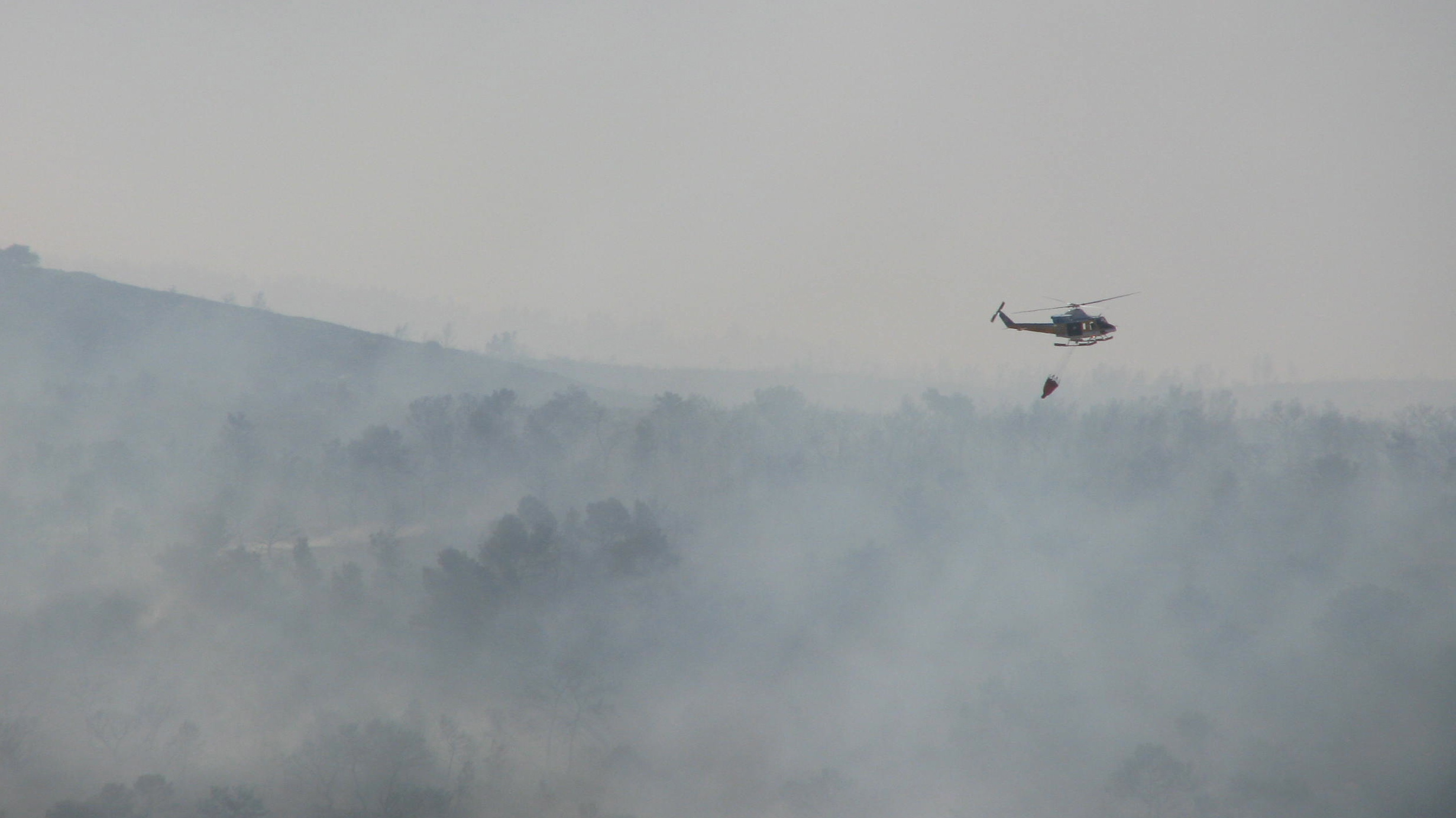
Cyprus Police Aviation Unit Bell 412EP participating in fire fighting efforts in Israel, during the 2010 Mount Carmel forest fire

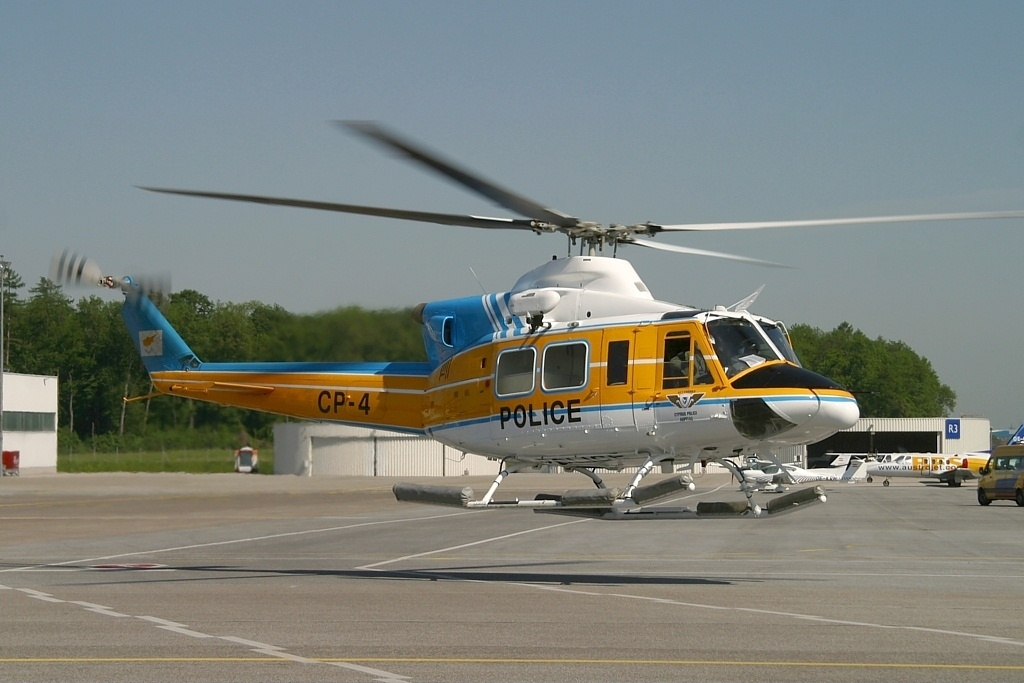
Cyprus Police Aviation Unit Bell 412EP

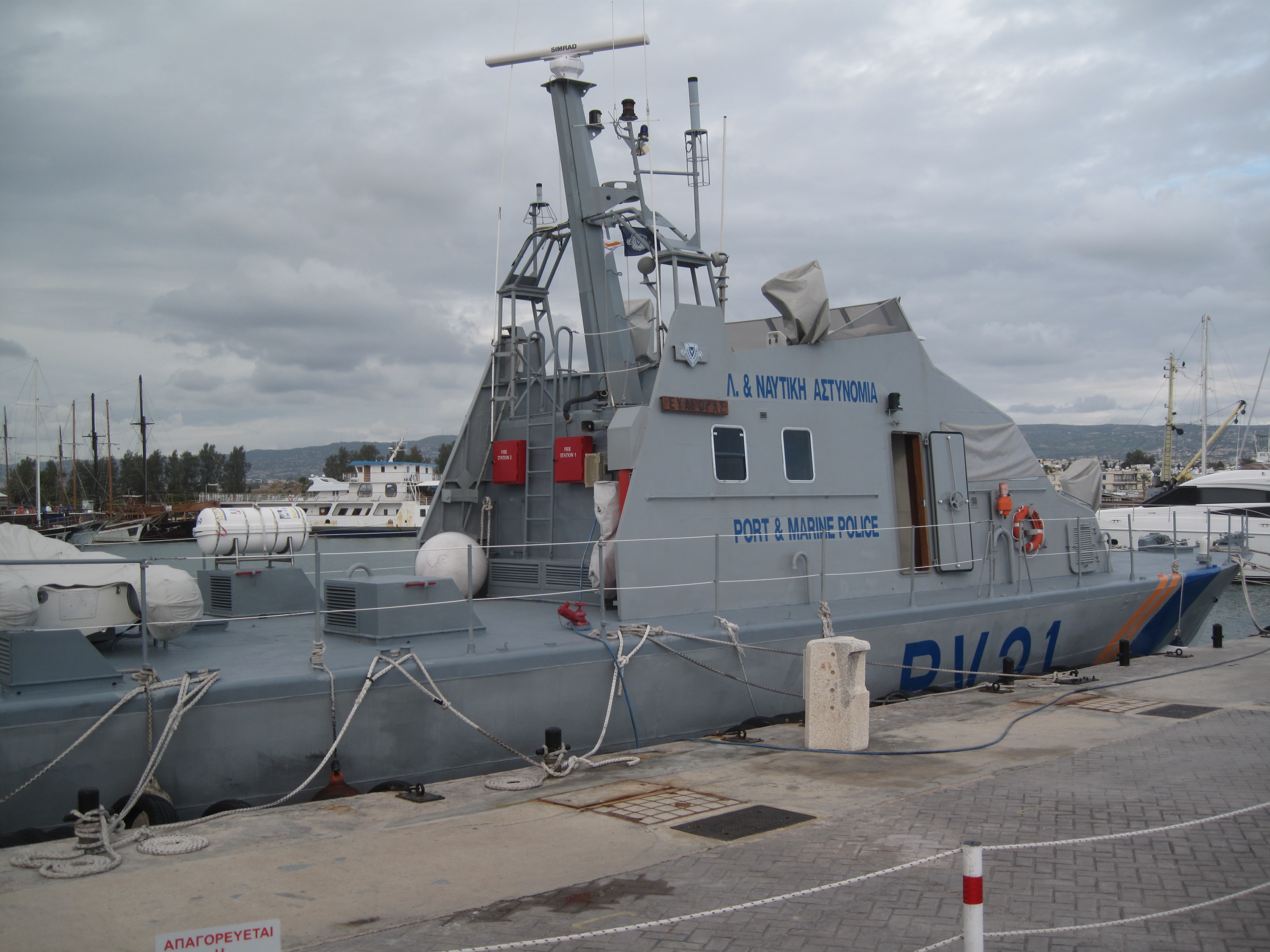
Cyprus Port and Marine Police jet F.P.B. (Fast sea Patrol Boat)

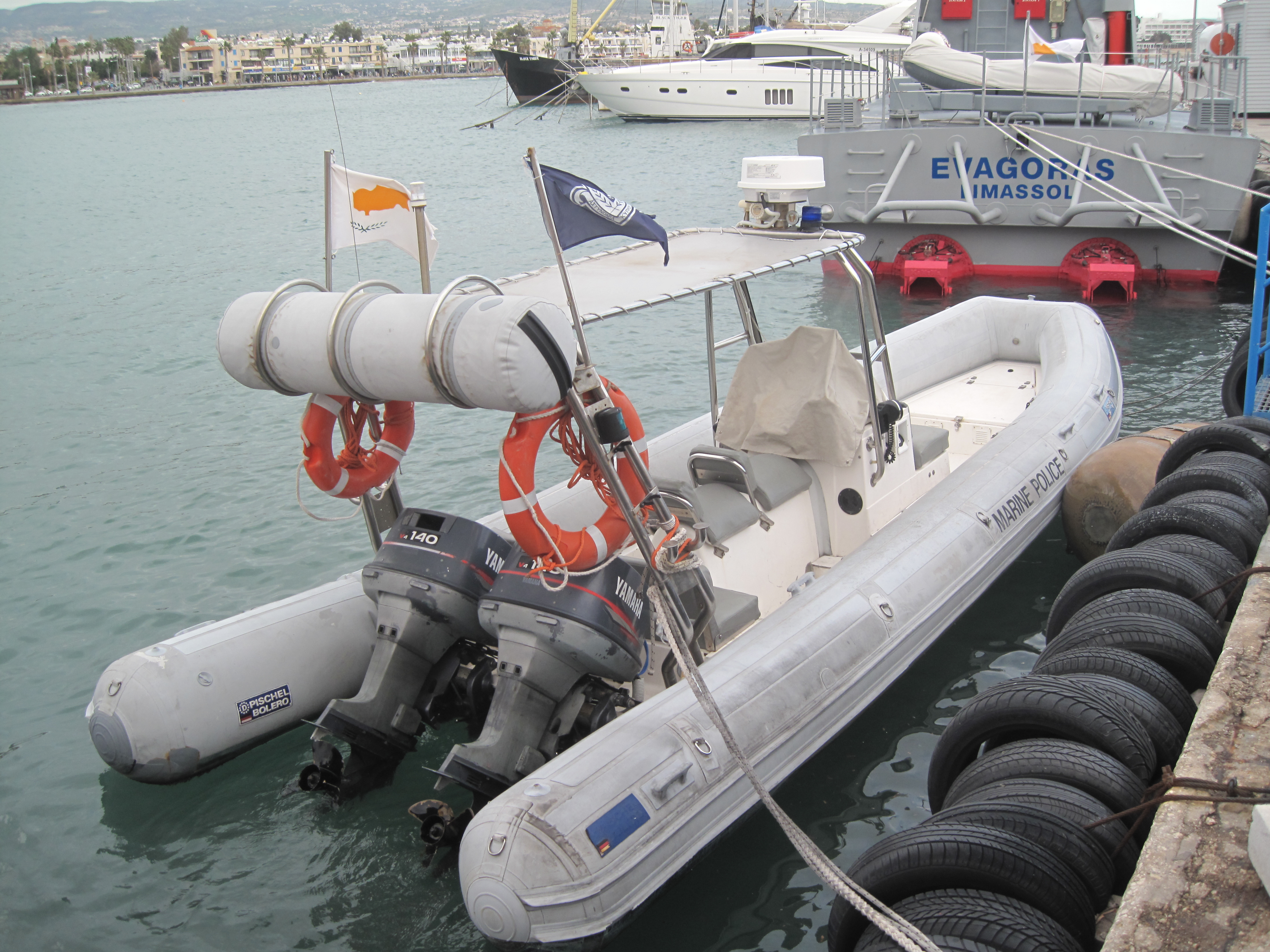
Cyprus Port and Marine Police R.I.B. (Rigid Inflatable Boat)

== See also ==
- Cyprus Civil Defence
- Cyprus Fire Service
- Cyprus Joint Rescue Coordination Center
- Cyprus Police Academy
- Cyprus Police Aviation Unit
- Cyprus Police Museum
- Cyprus Port & Marine Police
- Cyprus Prisons Department
- Hellenic Police
- Sovereign Base Areas Customs
- Sovereign Base Areas Police
- Cyprus Joint Police Unit
