= Cyprus Port and Marine Police =

Cyprus Port and Marine Police Λιμενική και Ναυτική Αστυνομία

- Racing stripe
- Abbreviation: Λ. & Ν.Α.

Agency overview
- Formed: 1960

Jurisdictional structure
- National agency (Operations jurisdiction): CY
- Operations jurisdiction: CY
- Area: Areas under the control of the Republic of Cyprus – 157.28 nautical miles - 37.71% of the coastline Excluding; Turkish occupied areas: 218.11 nautical miles - 52.29% of the coastline Buffer zone: 2.4 nautical miles, 0.57% of the coastline Sovereign British Bases: 39.32 nautical miles - 9.43% of the coastline (One Nautical mile = 1,852m)
- Population: 838,897
- Legal jurisdiction: Territorial waters: 12 nautical miles from the coast Contiguous zone: extends from the point the territorial waters and ends up to a distance of 24 nautical miles from the coast.
- Governing body: Cyprus Police
- Constituting instruments: The Constitution of the Republic of Cyprus; Police Law 73(I)2004; Criminal Code Cap.154; Criminal Procedure Law Cap.155; Evidence Law Cap-9; The Processing of Personal Data (Protection of the Individual) Law 138(1)/2001
- General nature: Civilian police
- Specialist jurisdiction: Coastal patrol, marine border protection, marine search and rescue

Operational structure
- Headquarters: Limassol, Cyprus
- Police Officers: about 330 personnel (2005)
- Minister responsible: Marios Hartsiotis
- Agency executives: Themistos Arnaoutis, Chief of Police; Unknown, Commander
- Parent agency: Cyprus Police
- Departments: Ports; Marine; Technical Support; Radar Surveillance

Facilities
- Port and Marine Stations: 15
- Boats: 5 Fast Sea Patrol Boats; 5 Patrol Boats; 6 Rigit Inflatable Boats

Website
- http://www.police.gov.cy/

The Cyprus Port & Marine Police (Greek: Λιμενική και Ναυτική Αστυνομία, Turkish: Liman ve Deniz Polisi) is the marine police and the civilian Coast Guard wing of the Cyprus Police. The coast guard are tasked with the primary mission of law enforcement of the waters around, and control of the sea borders of the Republic of Cyprus. Main roles are reported to include law enforcement of illicit activities such as smuggling, terrorism, piracy and illegal fishing. The Cyprus Port and Marine Police also serve a role as a search and rescue (SAR) force. This force is equipped with patrol boats and radars.

Cyprus Marine Police boats are notable by the "PV-" (Patrol Vessel) and "PL-" (Patrol Launch) prefixes on their pennant numbers, painted on the side of the hull.

== History ==
In 1956 a special committee, set up by the then British Colonial Government for the re-organisation of Cyprus Police, included in its report a proposal for the establishment of a Port and Marine Police in Cyprus. The new service was set up the following year equipped with seven boats. It operated as an independent Police Division with its headquarters at Famagusta and two permanent stations in Limassol and Larnaca. It also had a sub-station in Kyrenia which operated during the summer. In 1960, with the establishment of the independent Republic of Cyprus, the Port and Marine Police became a branch of the Police and the Gendarmerie.

The Turkish invasion of 1974 decimated the service as its installations at Famagusta Port were destroyed and five out of its seven boats were seized by the Turkish Army. After this event, the service continued to operate but only with two boats at its stations in Larnaca and Limassol. Its headquarters were transferred from Famagusta to the old port of Limassol.

== Developments since 1974 ==
From 1981 to 1983, two Plascoa launches were acquired from France, equipped with one 20 mm Oerlikon L70 cannon, one 12.7 mm and two 7.62mm machine guns. One of them was deleted from the service in 1991, another in 2000–2004.

In 1986, six local build Astrapi V (Fletcher Malibu) small speed boats. Later (circa 2004–2006) replaced by Novamarine rigid inflatable boats (RIBs).

In 1991, two FAC-23 patrol vessels were acquired from Yugoslavia, initially equipped with one 20 mm/90 caliber cannon and two 7.62 mm machine guns, later replaced by three 12.7 mm machine guns.

In 1992, five SAB-12 launches were transferred from Germany to Cyprus, without armament.

In 1998, a single Shaldag-class patrol vessel was acquired from Israel, initially equipped with one 20 mm/90 caliber cannon and two 12.7 mm machine guns, later replaced by three 12.7 mm machine guns.

In 2004, Cyprus took delivery of two FPB 30M (P-190)-class patrol vessels from Cantierre Navale Vittoria. These were initially equipped with one 12.7 mm and two 7.62 mm machine guns (on the forecastle, later also replaced with 12.7 mm machine guns).

In 2010, according to local press, Port and Marine Police fleet were planning to receive two more patrol boats (Length - approx. 15-16 meter, Width - 4–5 meters, Speed - not less than 43 knots).

In 2013, according to local press, the Port and Marine Police acquired two new police boats, that were purchased from Greece, as part of the cross-border cooperation program between the two countries. The two boats were purchased for €60m and are equipped with portable thermal scopes and other sophisticated equipment to combat various forms of organised cross-border crime such as illegal immigration and the smuggling of drugs and weapons in the area. The €48m of the total cost of the program has been funded by the EU.

In december 2023, the port and marine police received 3 new craft from Croatia named "Kyrenia", "Pentadaktylos" and "Kantara"

== Administration ==
Headquartered in Limassol the Port and Marine Police is administered by its Commander and Assistant Commanders.

The Commander has both administrative and operational responsibility and is accountable to the Chief of Police through the Assistant Chief of Support.

The Port and Marine Police includes the following offices: Message Control Centre, Registry, Stores, Accounts Office, Security Office and Operations Office.

=== Stations ===
The Port and Marine Police is made up of the following stations:

- Latsi Port and Marine Station
- Paphos Port and Marine Station
- Limassol New Port Station
- Limassol Marine Station
- Ayios Raphael Marina Port Station
- Larnaca Port and Marine Station
- Larnaca Marina Port Station
- Ayia Napa Marine Station
- Paralimni Marine Station

== Fleet since 1980 ==
The Port and Marine Police Fleet at present is made up of 16 boats which can be divided into three categories according to their size, construction, capability and mission. The three categories are:

Category A
Includes five fast sea patrol boats (F.P.B – JET) which can operate within a large radius – contiguous zone and open sea.

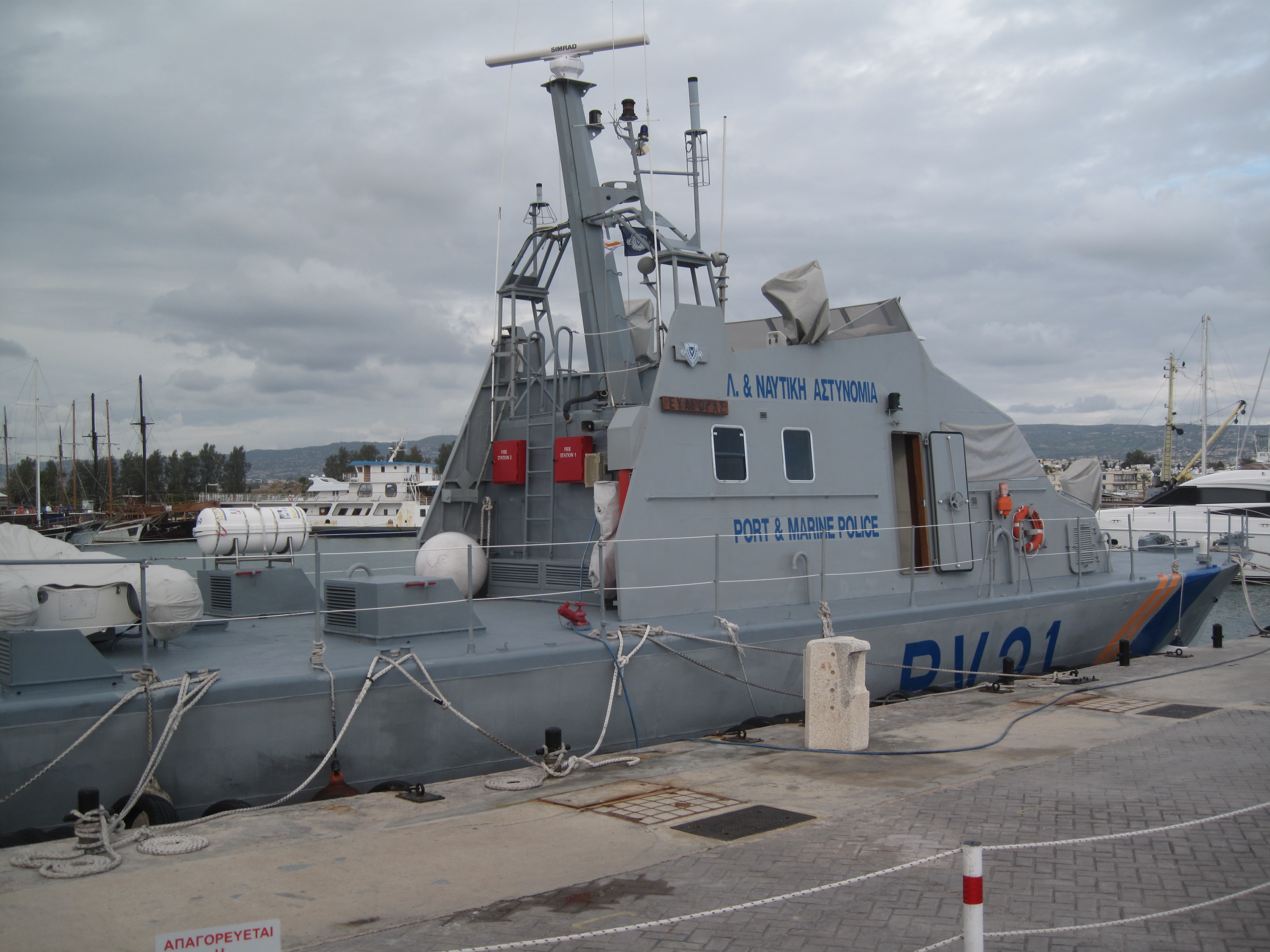
FAC-23 Class, Evagoras, Pennant PV-21 (side view)

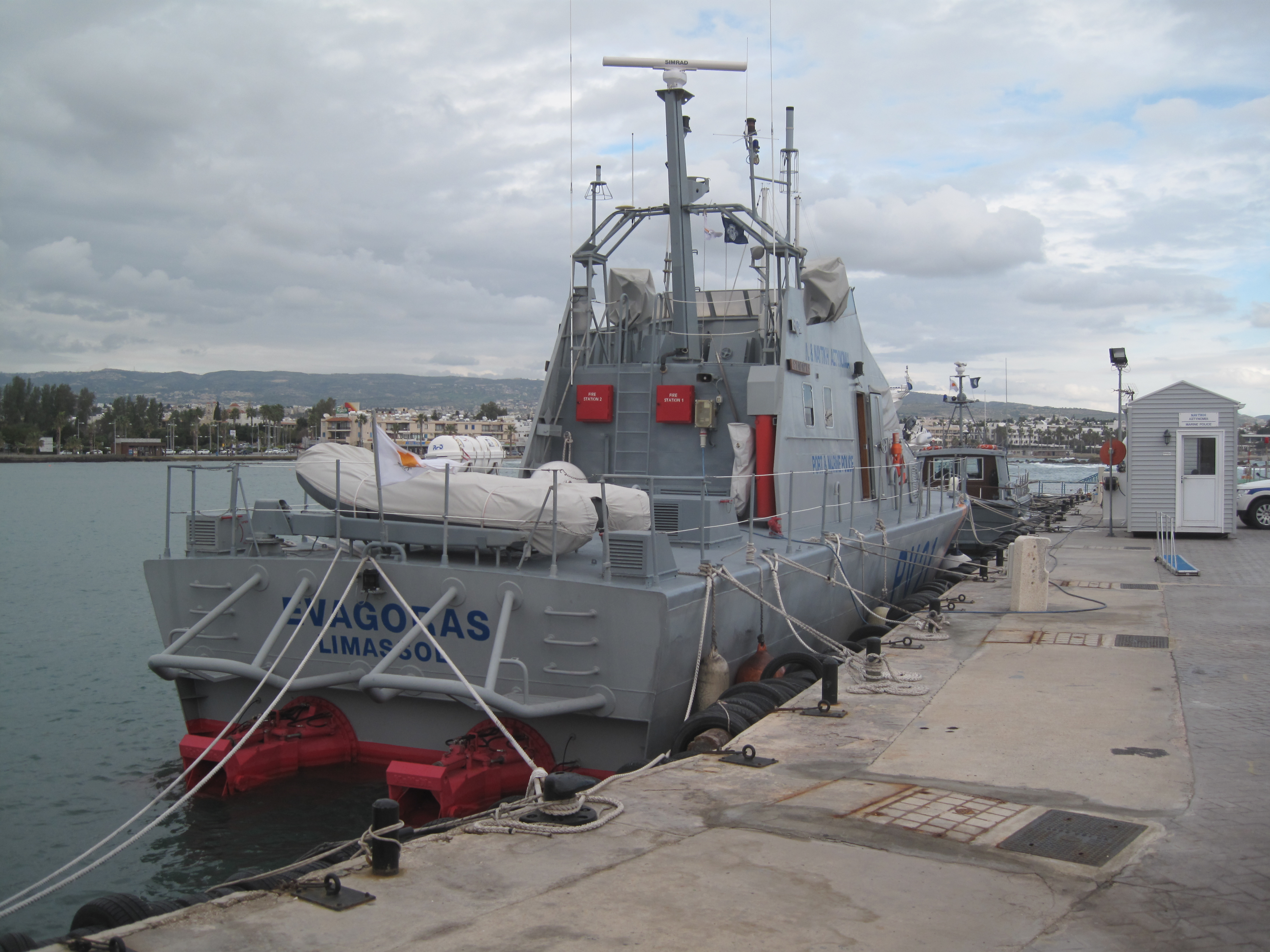
FAC-23 Class, Evagoras, Pennant PV-21 (rear view)

Category B
Includes five patrol boats (SAB – 12) which can operate within a medium-range radius – within territorial waters.

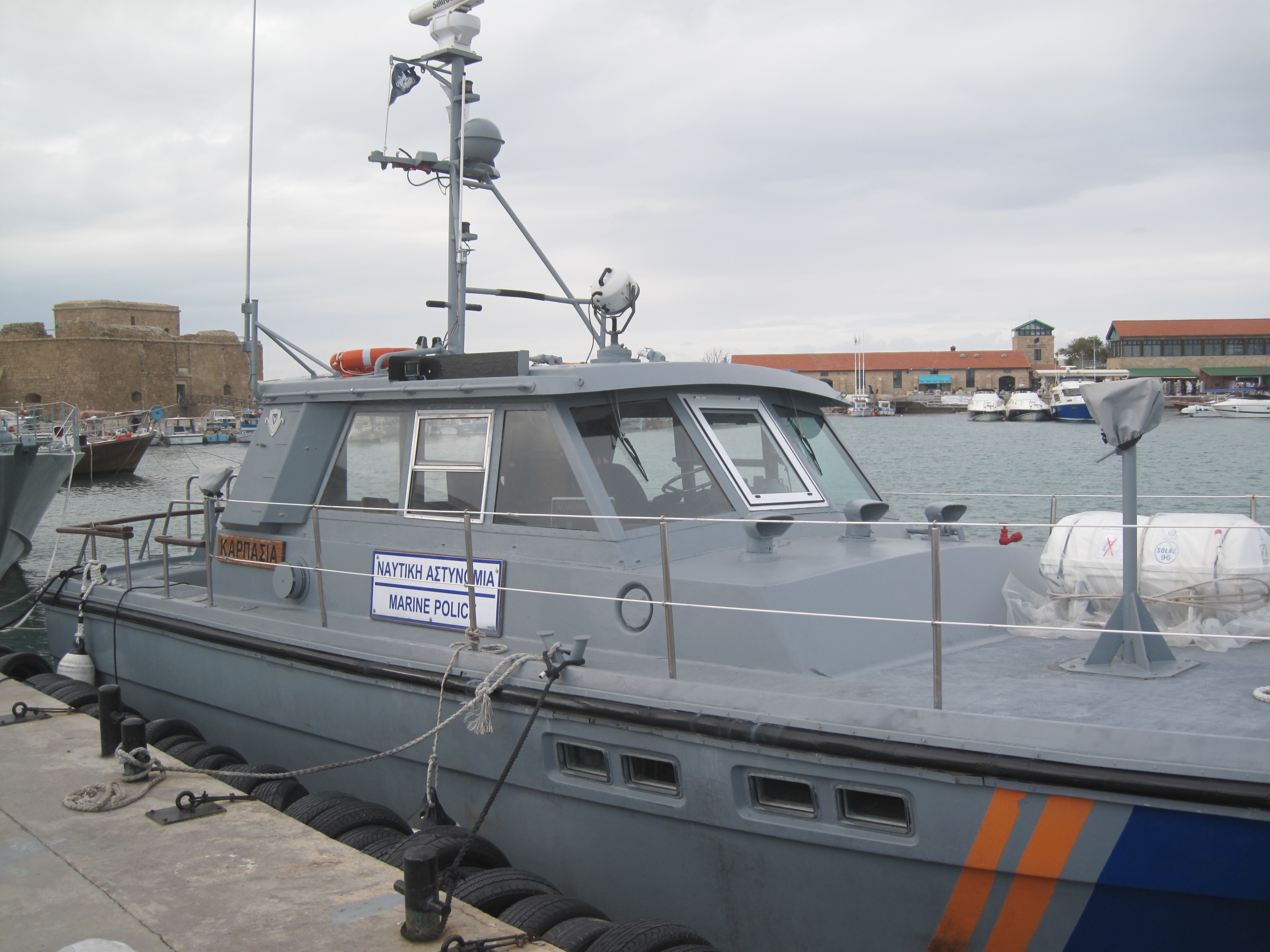
SAB-12 Class, Karpasia, Pennant PL-14

Category C
Includes six small inflatable speed boats (R.I.B./SP7) – mostly used close to shore.

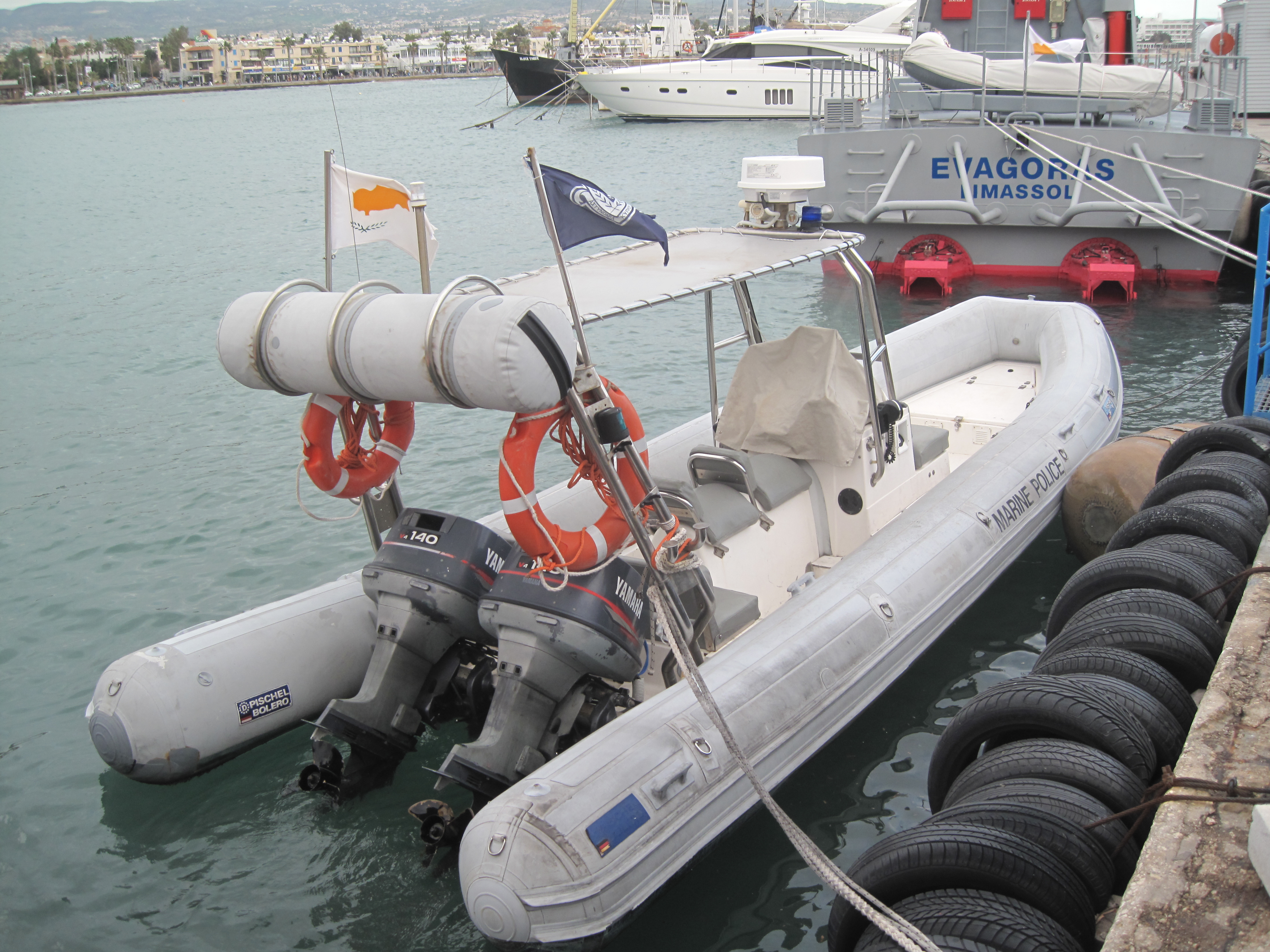
R.I.B. (Rigid Inflatable Boat)

Country of origin	Vessel type	Class	Name	Pennant	Status
Yugoslavia	Fast patrol boat (FPB)	FAC-23	Poseidon	PV-20	Active
Yugoslavia	Fast patrol boat (FPB)	FAC-23	Evagoras	PV-21	Active
Israel	Fast patrol boat (FPB)	Shaldag	Odyseus	PV-22	Active
Italy	Fast patrol boat (FPB)	FPB 30M	Theseas	PV-23	Active
Italy	Fast patrol boat (FPB)	FPB 30M	Onisilos	PV-24	Active
East Germany	Motor launch (ML)	SAB-12	Dionysos	PL-11	Active
East Germany	Motor launch (ML)	SAB-12	Kourion	PL-12	Active
East Germany	Motor launch (ML)	SAB-12	Ilarion	PL-13	Active
East Germany	Motor launch (ML)	SAB-12	Karpasia	PL-14	Active
East Germany	Motor launch (ML)	SAB-12	Akamas	PL-15	Active
Croatia	Fast Patrol Vessel	FPV	Kyrenia	PV 31	Active
Croatia	Fast Patrol Vessel	FPV	Kantara	PV 32	Active
Croatia	Fast Patrol Vessel	FPV	Pentadaktylos	PV 33	Active
Cyprus	Speed boat (SB)	Astrapi V	Astrapi 30	N/A	Replaced by RIB
Cyprus	Speed boat (SB)	Astrapi V	Astrapi 31	N/A	Replaced by RIB
Cyprus	Speed boat (SB)	Astrapi V	Astrapi 32	N/A	Replaced by RIB
Cyprus	Speed boat (SB)	Astrapi V	Astrapi 33	N/A	Replaced by RIB
Cyprus	Speed boat (SB)	Astrapi V	Astrapi 34	N/A	Replaced by RIB
Cyprus	Speed boat (SB)	Astrapi V	Astrapi 35	N/A	Replaced by RIB

== See also ==
- Cyprus Joint Rescue Coordination Center
- Cyprus Navy
- Cyprus Police
- Cyprus Police Aviation Unit
- Cyprus Police Museum
