= Mobile Immediate Action Unit =

Unit of the Cyprus Police

- Μηχανοκίνητη Μονάδα Άμεσης Δράσης (Μ.Μ.Α.Δ.)
- Active: 1978 - present
- Country: Cyprus
- Agency: Cyprus Police
- Type: Police tactical unit
- Role: Law enforcement Counterterrorism; Hostage Rescue; Riot control Protection of individuals
- Operations jurisdiction: National
- Headquarters: Nicosia, Cyprus
- Abbreviation: Μ.Μ.Α.Δ.

Commanders
- Current commander: Sofoklis Ionas
- Notable commanders: Kostas Papacostas

Notables
- Significant operation(s): Athienou hostage taking Oroklini hostage taking EgyptAir Flight 181; 2020 Greek–Turkish border crisis 2024 Summer Olympics; Manhunt for Theodoros Theofanous

Website
- www.police.gov.cy/police/police.nsf/department9_en/department9_en?OpenDocument

The Mobile Immediate Action Unit (Greek: Μηχανοκίνητη Μονάδα Άμεσης Δράσης; Μ.Μ.Α.Δ., romanized: Mechanokiniti Monada Amesis Drasis; MMAD) is a unit of the Cyprus Police, the national police of the Republic of Cyprus. The mission and responsibilities of the Emergency Response Unit are closely interwoven with the security of the State, the maintenance of law and order, and the provision of help and services to the public. The unit's mission is to address and suppress any terrorist, criminal, or other illegal activity against the State or the public throughout the territory of the Republic, including within its Exclusive Economic Zone (E.E.Z.).

Additionally, it has the mission of preventing, dealing with, and/or suppressing riots or other group acts of violence. Its Commander is accountable to the Chief of Police through the Assistant Chief of Police in charge of Support.

== Mission ==
The primary mission of the Emergency Response Unit is the operational support of policing throughout the Republic in combating organized, violent acts or crimes such as terrorism. It is also responsible for providing protection to VIPs and suppressing riots.

The secondary mission of the Emergency Response Unit is the provision of aid, services and rescue in cases of natural disasters or major accidents.

The unit also supports all other police departments and divisional headquarters in carrying out their operations. The Mobile Immediate Action Unit - MMAD - is composed of different teams. MMADs Special Anti-terrorist Squad are abbreviated SAS or EAO. MMADs Riot Control Unit are responsible for public order.

== History ==
The Immediate Action Unit was created in 1978 by a former Cypriot National Guard Colonel Costas Papacostas in the wake of the emerging terrorist threat that was beginning to arise in Europe and certain terrorist incidents that had happened in Cyprus up until that point (Such as the Egyptian raid on Larnaca International Airport).

Since its creation, the unit has been involved in highly popular, at times infamous, cases. One such case came in 1984 where the Special Anti-terrorist Squad of the Immediate Action Unit, apprehended and arrested escaped convict in his home in Limassol who was armed with a Kalashnikov a pistol and grenades.

Another case was in 1988 in the Athienou village of Larnaka, where a soldier from the Turkish Armed Forces crossed the Green line, entered a house and attempted to take a family hostage, however was unsuccessful. Unarmed Cypriot National Guard soldiers (Charalampos Charalambous and Gianni Kalesi), who heard the family screams attempted to go and find out what the issue was. Both guardsmen were shot by the Turkish corporal. Later the house was surrounded by the MMAD Special Anti-Terrorist Squad. After refusing to surrender and firing at the officers, they made entry and killed the Turkish corporal. Of the two Cypriot soldiers, Charalampos Charalamopous was killed and his fellow soldier injured.

One of the few failures of the unit came in December 1993 where during a hostage rescue, though the perpetrator was killed, the hostage was too. In the crossfire the hostage was shot and later succumbed to her wounds.

Another notable case came in the end of 2008 and the beginning of January 2009 where MMADs Special Anti-terrorist Squad - SAS or EAO - were deployed. After being tipped off by officers of the counter-narcotics unit YKAN, operators entered and arrested Anthony Prokopiou Kita - known as the Cypriot Al Capone - after he had escaped from prison and was responsible for firing at police officers with a pistol whilst on the run.

In 2016 during the hijacking of EgyptAir Flight 181, MMAD alongside its Special Anti-terrorist Squad were on scene at Larnaca International Airport for both hostage rescue and as an assault force if the need had arisen. It was MMAD who proceeded to arrest the hijacker.

In 2020 during the 2020 Greek–Turkish border crisis, a group of some 22 MMAD operators deployed to the Evros region to assist the Hellenic Police against the illegal migrants who were being sent from Turkey. The illegal migrants were sent by the Turkish government to the Greek border.

MMADs riot control unit tends to operate when there is a sporting event, civil disorder or disorder at the Pournara migrant camp in Kokkinotrimithia.

MMAD also sent a Canine Unit to France as part of the assistance for the 2024 Summer Olympics.

== Structure ==
The MMAD is split into several branches to better handle the operations that are assigned to the Unit.
