= Cyprus Civil Defence =

Cypriot government organization

- Politiki Amyna; Πολιτική Άμυνα; Sivil Savunma
- Cyprus Civil Defence logo

Civil Defence overview
- Formed: 1964; 62 years ago
- Superseding Civil Defence: Ministry of Interior of the Republic of Cyprus
- Jurisdiction: Republic of Cyprus
- Headquarters: John Kennedy 23, Lakatamia, Nicosia
- Minister responsible: Constantinos Ioannou, Minister of Interior
- Civil Defence executive: Maria Papa, Commander of the Civil Defence Force
- Website: www.moi.gov.cy/cd

The Cyprus Civil Defence Force (Greek: Δύναμη Πολιτικής Άμυνας Κύπρου, Turkish: Kıbrıs Sivil Savunma Kuvvetleri) carries out various humanitarian projects intended to protect the civilian population and to help it recover from the immediate effects of hostilities or disasters, as well as to provide the conditions necessary for its survival.

Its leader—Commander of the Civil Defence Force—is currently Maria Papa.

== History ==
During the establishment of the Republic of Cyprus, there was no organized Civil Defence on the island. Immediately after the Turkish bombings of Tilliria in 1964, the need to create an organized Civil Defence was evident. Thus with the passage of the Civil Defence Law of 1964 by the House of Representatives, a provision was made for the organisation of political forces and defense services, either on voluntary or compulsory basis, the training of citizens in the Civil Defence, on the procurement and storage of supplies and on the construction of shelters.

Provisions were also made for requisitioning, purchase and lease of movable or immovable property. According to the provisions of the Act, the Council of Ministers adopted a regulation passed by the House in 1986 and were subsequently amended with the basis on which the Civil Defense Force was established.

The Law on Civil Defence amended and consolidated in 1996 and then voted on the new Civil Defence (General) Regulations 1997 to strengthen and reorganize the whole system of Civil Defense of the Republic.

== See also ==
Cyprus Defense related topics:

- Cypriot National Guard
- Cyprus Fire Service
- Cyprus Joint Rescue Coordination Center
- Cyprus Police
