= Costas Fitiris =

Minister of Justice of Cyprus

- Κώστας Φυτιρής
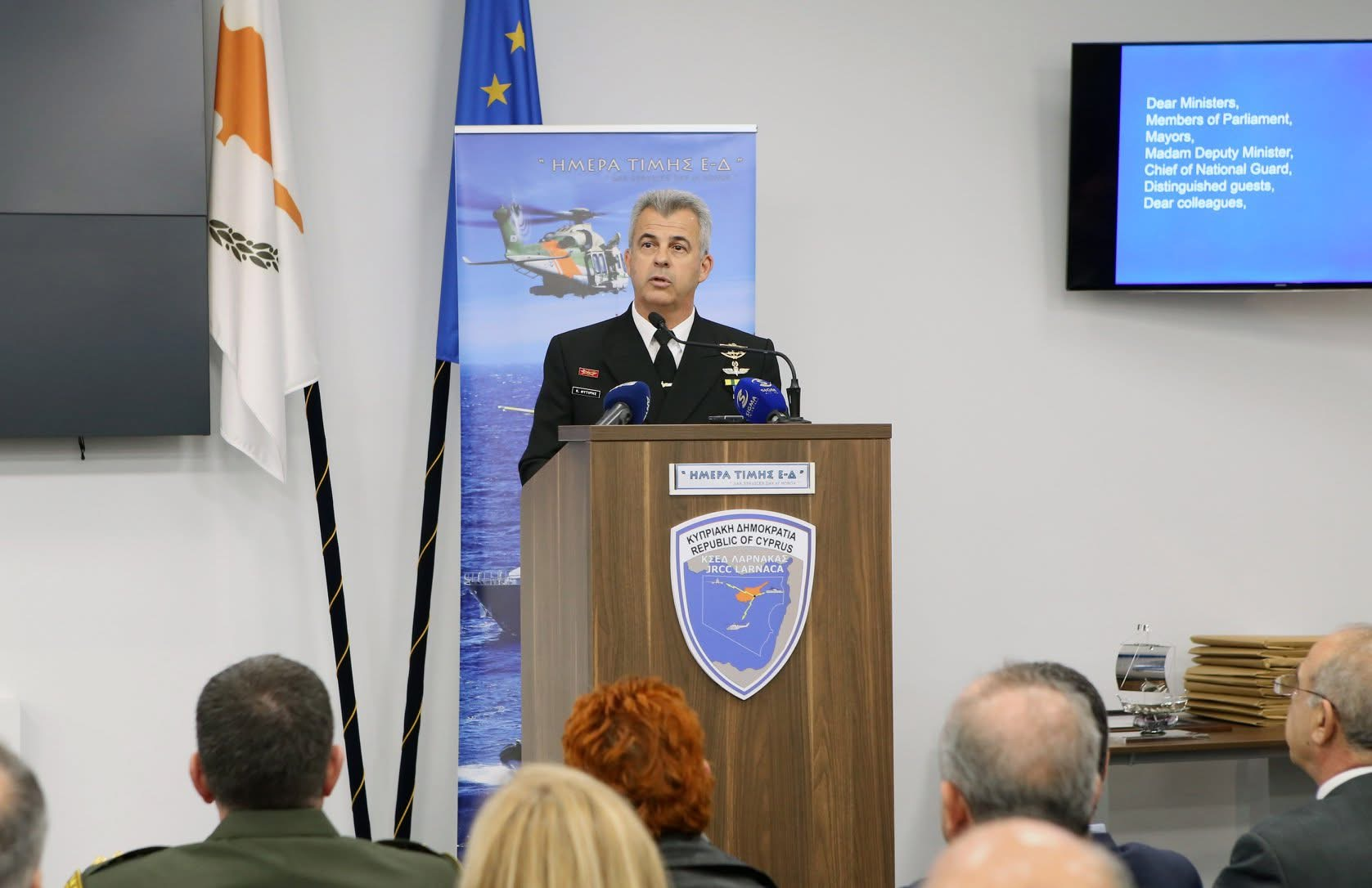
- Rear Admiral Costas Fitiris at the Cyprus JRCC.

Minister of Justice and Public Order
- Incumbent
- Assumed office December 2025
- President: Nikos Christodoulides
- Preceded by: Marios Hartsiotis

Personal details
- Born: December 28, 1960 (age 65) Paralimni, Cyprus

Military service
- Allegiance: Cyprus
- Branch/service: Cyprus National Guard
- Years of service: 1982–2018
- Rank: Rear Admiral

Costas Fitiris (born 28 December 1960) is a Cypriot politician and retired naval officer who has served as the Minister of Justice and Public Order of the Republic of Cyprus since December 2025.

He previously served for nearly four decades in the Cyprus National Guard, retiring in 2018 with the rank of Rear Admiral. Fitiris is known for his long service in the Cyprus Navy’s Underwater Demolition Unit (ΜΥΚ), where he served for thirteen years including a period as commander, and for commanding the Joint Rescue Coordination Center (JRCC / ΚΣΕΔ) from 2010 to 2018. He is the principal author of the national crisis-management plan ZINON and one of the architects of the Amalthea maritime humanitarian corridor.

== Early life and education ==
Fitiris was born on 28 December 1960 in Paralimni, Cyprus. He entered the Hellenic Naval Academy in 1978 and graduated in 1982 with the rank of Ensign.

His further military education included attendance at the Hellenic Naval War College, the Supreme Joint War College (Ανώτατη Σχολή Εθνικής Άμυνας), the Submarine Officers School, and the Hellenic Navy Underwater Demolition School (ΟΥΚ). Between 1987 and 1989, he completed studies in Civil Engineering at the Military School of Engineering in Athens.

== Military career ==
=== Early service ===
Following his graduation from the Naval Academy, Fitiris served as a junior officer aboard fast attack craft and submarines of the Cyprus Navy and, during periods of training, of the Hellenic Navy.

=== Service in the Underwater Demolition Unit (ΜΥΚ) ===
In 1990, Fitiris was assigned to the Underwater Demolition Unit (Μονάδα Υποβρυχίων Καταστροφών, ΜΥΚ), the naval special forces unit of Cyprus. He served in the unit for thirteen years, from 1990 to 2003, holding a variety of operational positions and later serving as its commander.

During his tenure, the unit upgraded its diving capability, underwater demolition capability, and maritime special operations readiness. Fitiris is associated with reforms that strengthened training structures, equipment and operational planning within ΜΥΚ.

=== Operational and staff roles ===
After his service in ΜΥΚ, Fitiris served as Director of Operations of the Cyprus Navy between 2003 and 2005, and as Director of Operations at the National Guard General Staff from 2006 to 2010.

Between 2014 and 2018, he also served as Director of the Minister of Defence’s Staff Office (ΕΠΥΠΑΜ) and Director of the National Security Authority (Εθνική Αρχή Ασφαλείας).

Since 2011, Fitiris has acted as national coordinator for maritime safety and the support of offshore hydrocarbon operations in Cyprus’ Exclusive Economic Zone (EEZ), working with relevant ministries and private-sector operators.

=== Commander of the JRCC (ΚΣΕΔ) ===
From July 2010 to December 2018, Fitiris served as commander of the Joint Rescue Coordination Center (JRCC / ΚΣΕΔ) in Larnaca.

Under his leadership, ΚΣΕΔ modernized its command-and-control systems, expanded interagency cooperation, and enhanced Cyprus' maritime and aeronautical search and rescue capability. His tenure included oversight of major SAR missions and coordination of multinational exercises, including Exercise ARGONAUT.

Fitiris is listed as commander of ΚΣΕΔ in official government emergency preparedness documentation, including the National Contingency Plan for Marine Pollution.

=== National crisis-management planning ===
Fitiris is the principal author of the National Crisis Management Plan ZINON, adopted by the Council of Ministers in 2013. The plan defines categories of national crises, outlines ministerial and operational crisis structures, and forms the overarching doctrine for Cyprus’ interagency crisis response.

=== Amalthea Initiative ===
Fitiris was identified in several media and public broadcasts as an author and architect of the Amalthea Initiative, the Cyprus-led maritime humanitarian corridor to Gaza developed in 2024–2025.

His contribution included drafting operational concepts, advising on maritime risk management, and supporting coordination with EU, UN and regional actors. The initiative was later supported by European mechanisms using Cyprus’ national crisis infrastructure.

== Post-military career ==
Fitiris retired from active service on 28 December 2018 with the rank of Rear Admiral. In January 2019, he assumed duties as Chief Marina Officer of Ayia Napa Marina.

He has participated as a speaker at conferences and seminars on crisis management, search and rescue, maritime security, and offshore energy safety.

== Political career ==
On the 5th of December 2025, President Nikos Christodoulides appointed Fitiris as Minister of Justice and Public Order. He formally assumed office shortly thereafter, succeeding Marios Hartsiotis.

== Personal life ==
Media reports indicate that Fitiris is married with children.
