= Cyprus Fire Service =

National Fire and Rescue service of Cyprus

- Πυροσβεστική Υπηρεσία Κύπρου; Pirosvestiki Ipiresia Kiprou; Kıbrıs İtfaiyesi
- Emblem of the Cyprus Fire Service

Fire Service overview
- Formed: 1960
- Preceding Fire Service: Police Fire Brigade
- Jurisdiction: Republic of Cyprus
- Headquarters: Nicosia, Cyprus
- Employees: 721
- Child Fire Service: Ε.Μ.Α.Κ. Ειδική Μονάδα Αντιμετώπισης Καταστροφών
- Website: www.fs.gov.cy

Footnotes
- Emergency Telephone Number 112 or 199

The Cyprus Fire Service (Greek: Πυροσβεστική Υπηρεσία Κύπρου - Firefighting Service of Cyprus. Turkish: Kıbrıs İtfaiyesi) is the national firefighting service of Cyprus, with the principle task of undertaking of rescues from building rubble, the highlands, water bodies (sea, dams etc.), major traffic accidents, aviation accidents and fire disasters as well as firefighting on ships, aircraft, petroleum installations, buildings, rural areas, forest areas and chemical fires (HAZMAT)

== History ==
The first form of organized fire brigade was formed in the 1920s, on a primitive basis for today's standards, by the Municipalities of the city of Nicosia and Limassol. Firefighting, among other tasks, was undertaken by volunteers and employees of the municipalities. At the same time, in Nicosia, the “Police Fire Brigade” was formed to the standards of other British colonies of the time, with Police Officers being organised into firefighting groups, depending on the circumstances and the time.

In 1935 with the reorganization of the Police, the “Police Fire Brigade” were organized on a firmer basis, introducing new vehicles, permanent staff that were serving as Police Special Constables and were specifically trained for the task. A fire station was built next to the Paphos Gate Police station, both of which exist at the same location today.
With the outbreak of the Second World War and the establishment of the British Department of Air Defence for the protection from air raids, firefighting teams were established in all cities. With the end of the war, fire stations were established in the towns of Limassol and Famagusta. Permanent Police Officers along with emergency personnel were manning the stations.

The Fire Service, in its present form, was launched in the mid-1950s, to meet the needs of the British that arose, due to the anti-colonial struggle of Cypriots and the developments in the Suez area. New Fire Stations were created in all cities with permanent staff. The legislation which is in force until today, the "Cyprus Fire Service" was formed within the organizational structure of the police.

The Fire Service used to operate as an independent Division of Cyprus Police with its base in Nicosia. The Service provided national coverage since 1960. At 15/10/2021 the Cyprus Fire Service was established as an independent service and was separated from the organic structure of the Police.

== Rank Structure ==
Before the separation of the Fire Service from the Police, firefighters held ranks identical to those of police officers, and even carried the same insignia and badges, with the only distinction being the red coloured tone applied to various identifiers, such as headwear, shoulder marks and badges. Nowadays, and following the separation, the service uses distinct and unique markings that distinguish them from police officers, especially under formal wear.

=== Ranks of the Cyprus Fire Service (2021 - Today) ===
Title	Chief Fire Officer (Αρχιπύραρχος)	Deputy Chief Fire Officer (Πύραρχος)	Assistant Chief Fire Officer (Αντιπύραρχος)	Station Manager (Πυραγός)	Watch Manager (Υποπυραγός)	Crew Manager (Πυρονόμος)	Firefighter (Πυροσβέστης)
Insignia							

=== Ranks of the Cyprus Fire Service (1960 - 2021) ===
Title	Chief superintendent (Ανώτερος Αστυνόμος)	Superintendent A (Αστυνόμος Α)	Superintendent B (Αστυνόμος Β)	Chief inspector (Ανώτερος Υπαστυνόμος)	Inspector (Υπαστυνόμος)	Senior sergeant (Αρχιλοχίας)	Sergeant (Λοχίας)	Acting sergeant / Senior Firefighter (Αναπληρωτής Λοχίας / Αρχιπυροσβέστης)	Acting Sergeant (Αναπληρωτής Λοχίας)	Senior Firefighter (Αρχιπυροσβέστης)	Firefighter (Πυροσβέστης)
Insignia											

== Disaster Response Special Unit ==
34.830280°N 33.393060°E

Disaster Response Special Unit (D.R.S.U.)
- Ε.Μ.Α.Κ. Ειδική Μονάδα Αντιμετώπισης Καταστροφών; Eidiki Monada Antimetopisis Katastrofon; Afetlere Müdahale Birimi

Unit overview
- Formed: 2 April 2002
- Jurisdiction: Republic of Cyprus
- Headquarters: Kofinou, Larnaca, Cyprus
- Motto: ΘΑΡΣΕΙΝ ΣΩΖΕΙΝ
- Employees: 45 (See Members)
- Parent department: Cyprus Fire Service

=== History ===
Although the formation of a special unit responding to disasters within the structure of the Fire Service was a concept that existed for several years, there were no significant steps made to implement it, but the large destructive earthquakes that struck Cyprus’ neighboring countries, Türkiye and Greece in 1999, revealed the urgent need to create such a special unit for dealing with major disasters in the country.

So, on 2 April 2002, the Cyprus Fire Service, established the Disaster Response Special Unit (Greek: Ε.Μ.Α.Κ. Ειδική Μονάδα Αντιμετώπισης Καταστροφών). The D.R.S.U. team is staffed by 50 firefighters from almost all districts of Cyprus. The unit is based in Kofinou due to the central location of this community, to allow easy access in the areas of Cyprus that are not occupied.

=== Capabilities ===
The unit is tasked with handling serious disasters that require specialised knowledge and skills that an untrained firefighter would be unable to provide.

The unit's objectives are "dealing with the consequences of natural, technological and other disasters at events, such as earthquakes, tornadoes, floods and the search and rescue of life both on land and at sea". Moreover, it is tasked with responding to "serious and catastrophic large-scale episodes where life and/or property is at threat, or natural and forest environments are".

The unit claims to be "trained and capable of handling events" that require the following:

- Rescue of persons trapped under rubble and debris.
- Specialised rescue from mountainous terrain and heights.
- SCUBA diving.
- K9 Search and Rescue from rubble and open spaces.
- Rescue from swift waters and flooded areas.

=== Members ===
When the D.R.S.U. was founded, 50 firefighter positions were allocated to the unit. Today, that number sits at 45, with one Station Manager who is the Unit's Commander and 44 unit members - of which 5 are trainee firefighters.

=== Training ===
For the success of the unit’s objectives specialised training is required, so the members of the unit receive training both in Cyprus and abroad. Courses in Cyprus mainly involve climbing and rappelling at steep areas to rescue people, classes to handle polytraumatic patients, rescuing people that were involved in traffic accidents and more. A number of elite members of the Unit also receive specialised search and rescue scuba diving training for sea, lakes and dams.
