= Cyprus military ranks =

The Cyprus military ranks are the military insignia used by the Cypriot National Guard. Due to its close ties to Greece, Cyprus shares a rank structure with that of Greece and are based on Ancient Greek and Byzantine terminology.

== Commissioned officer ranks ==
The rank insignia of commissioned officers.

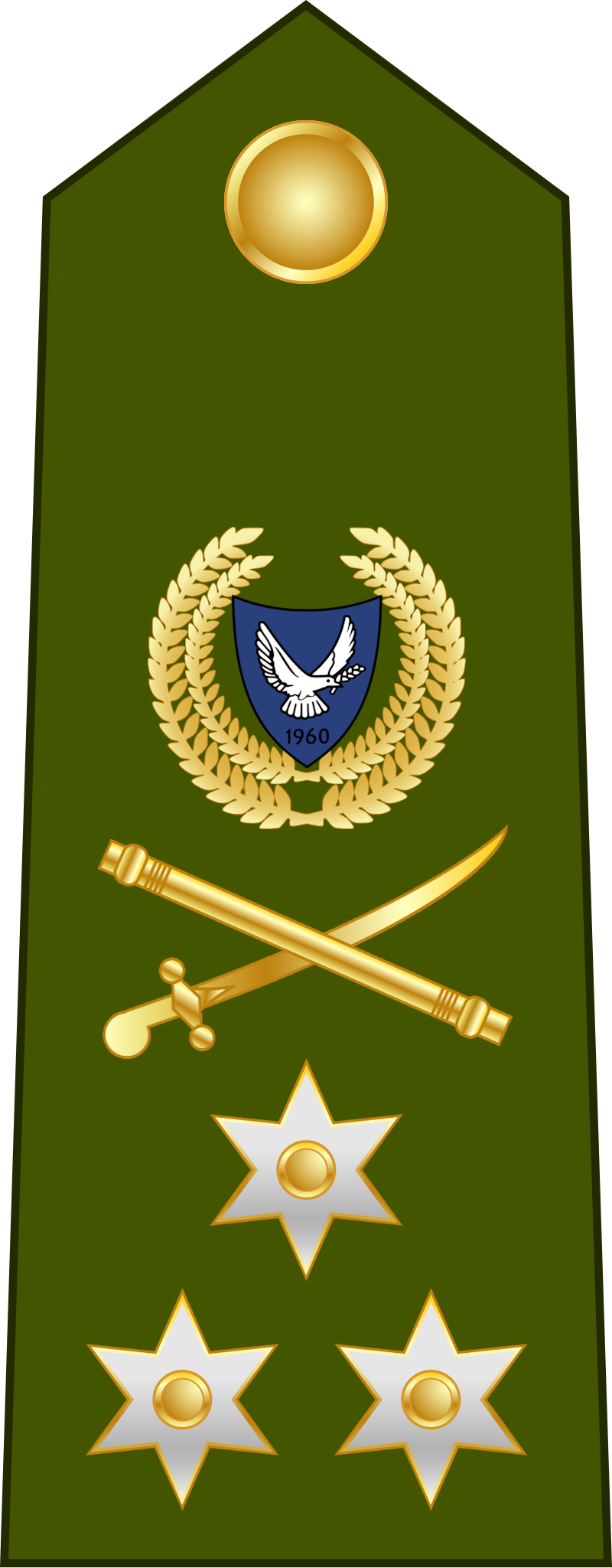
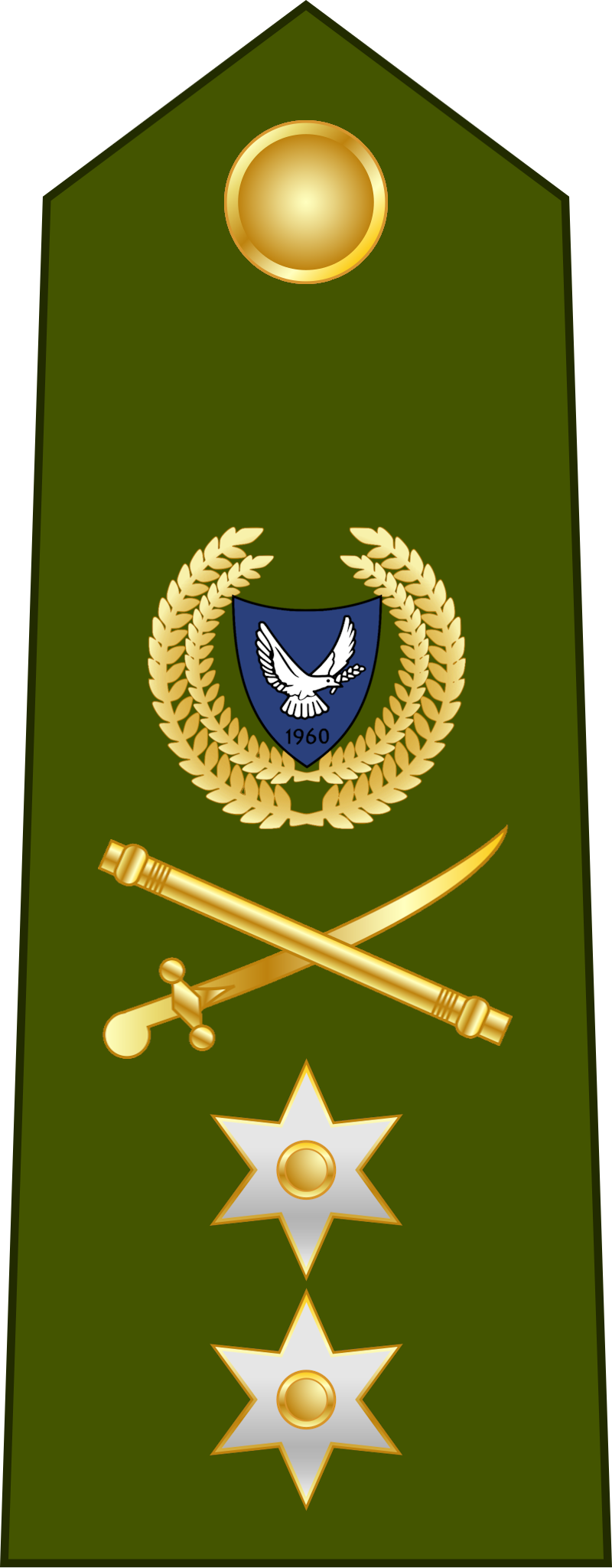
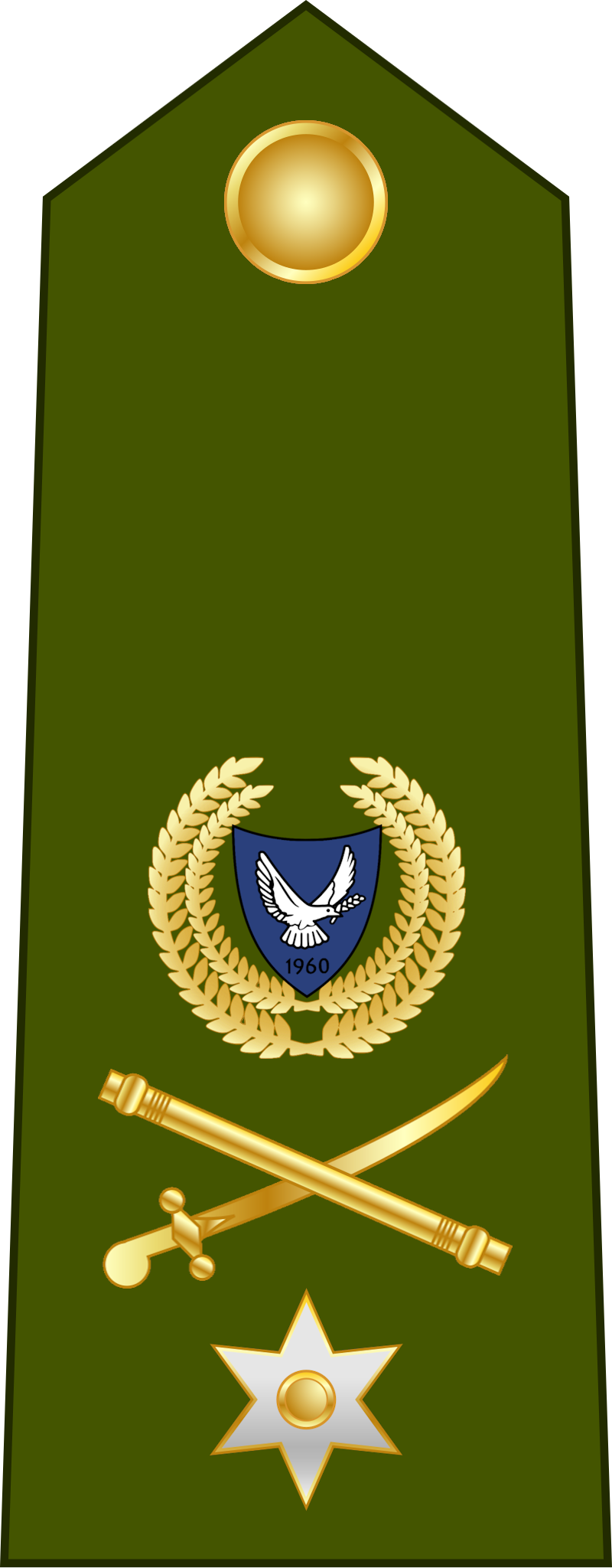
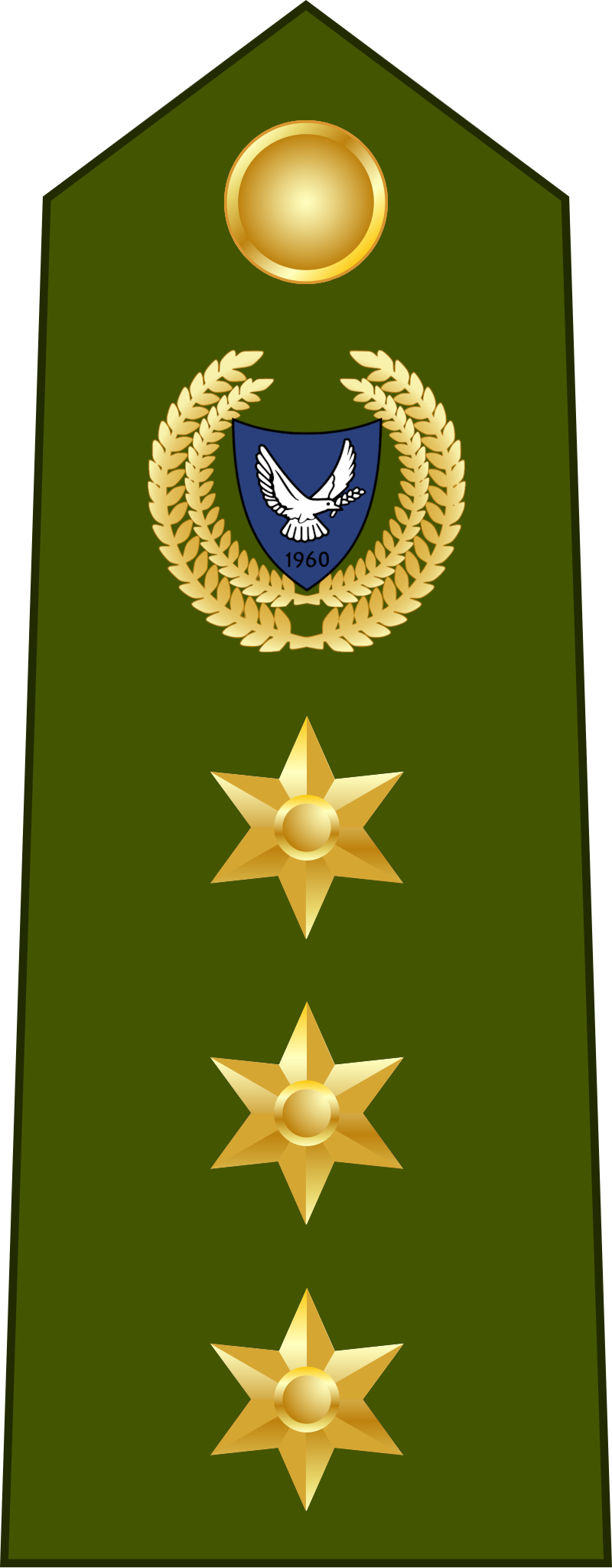
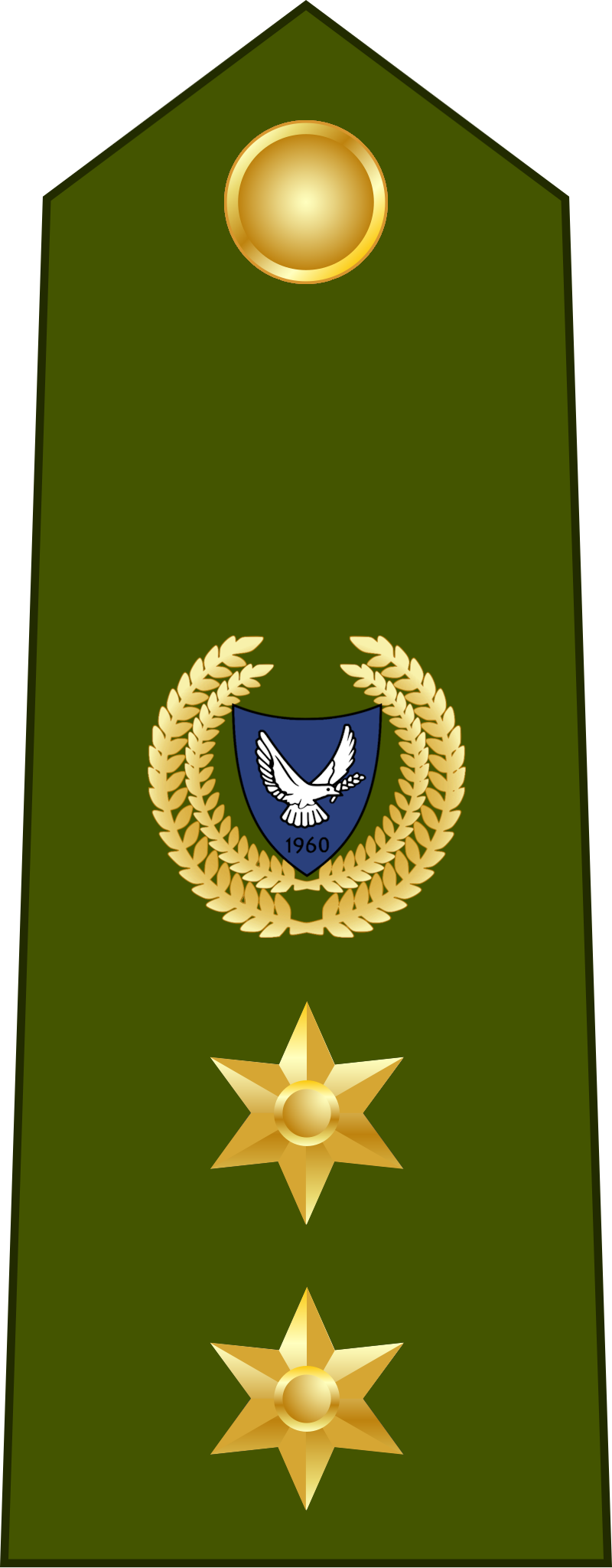
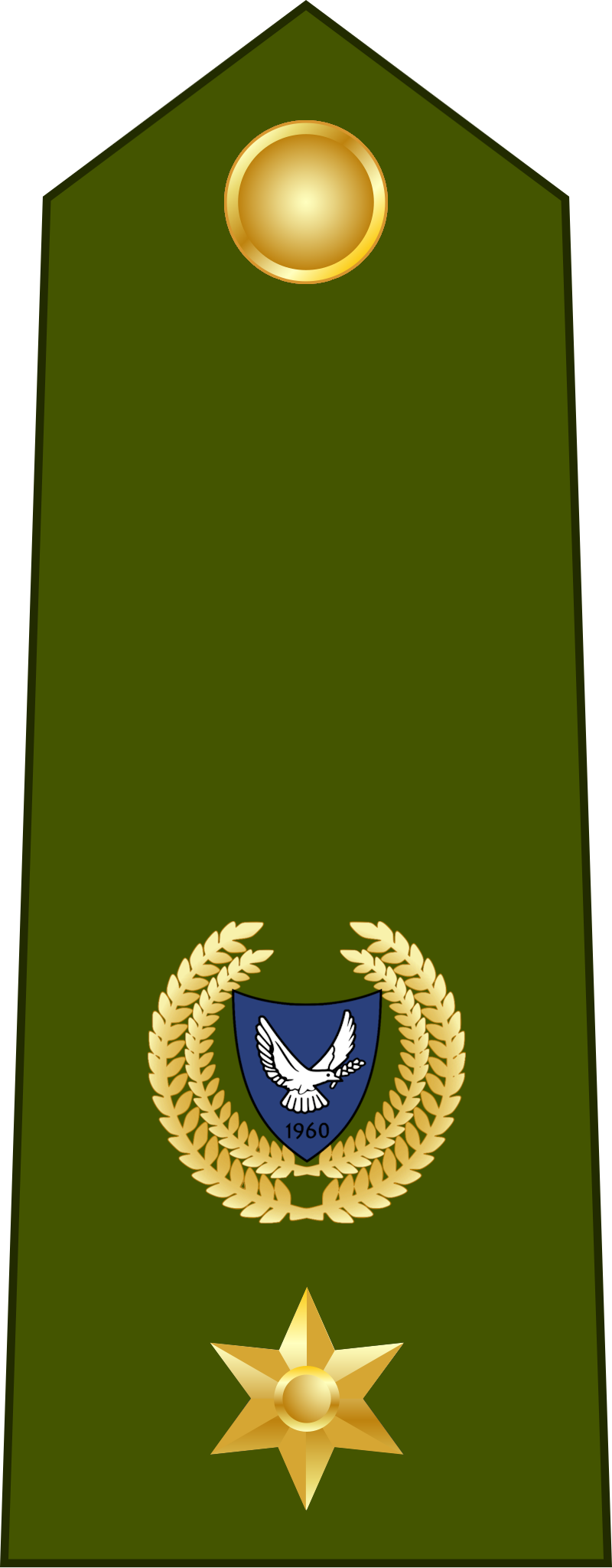
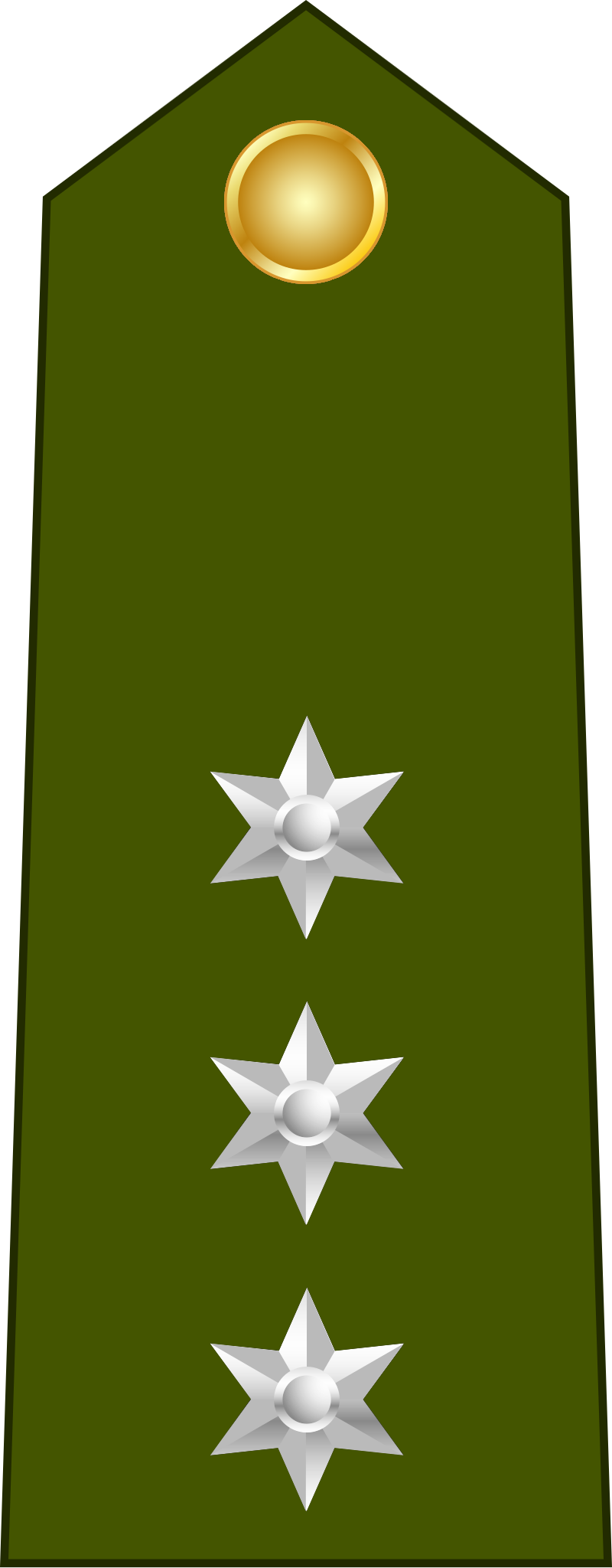
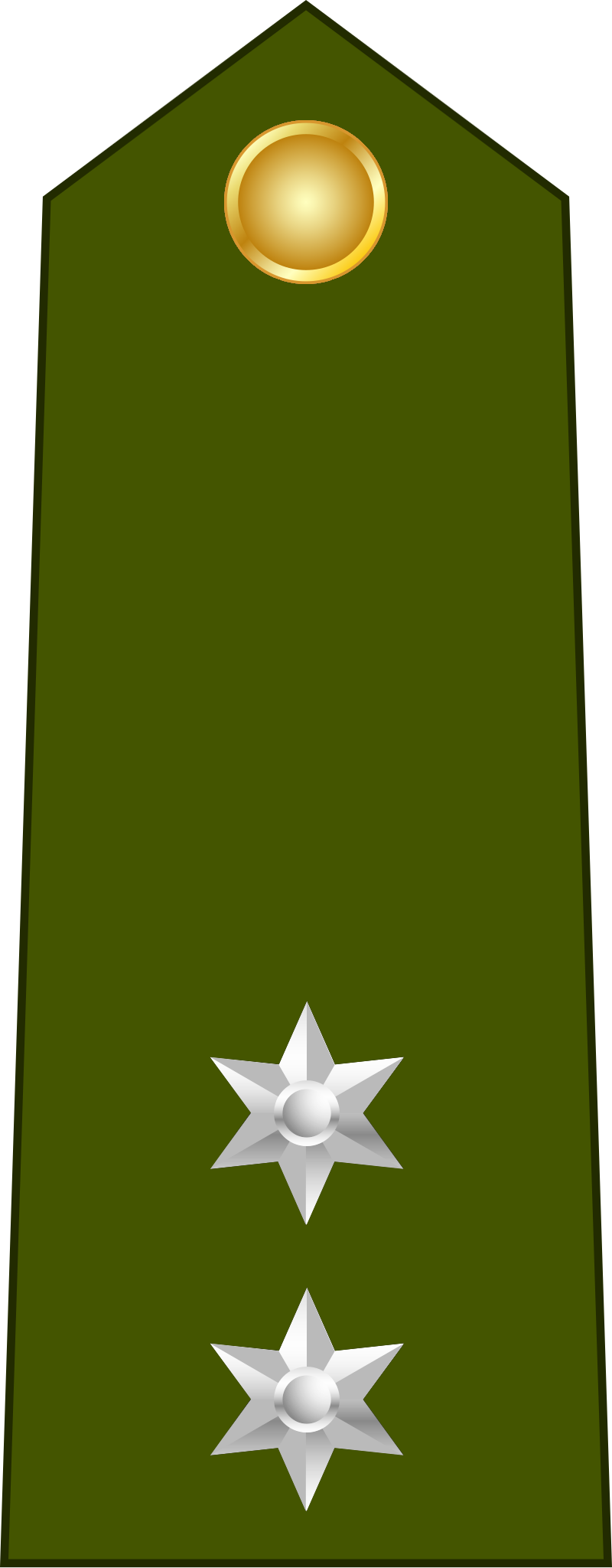
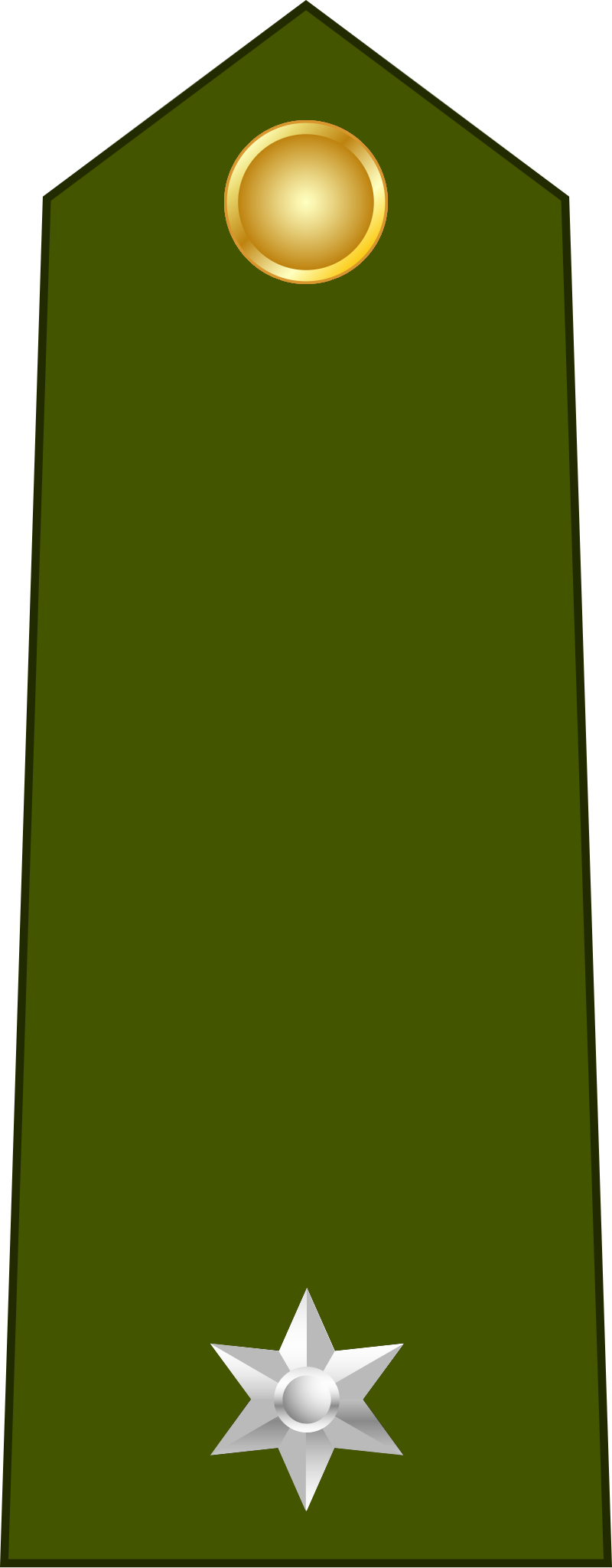
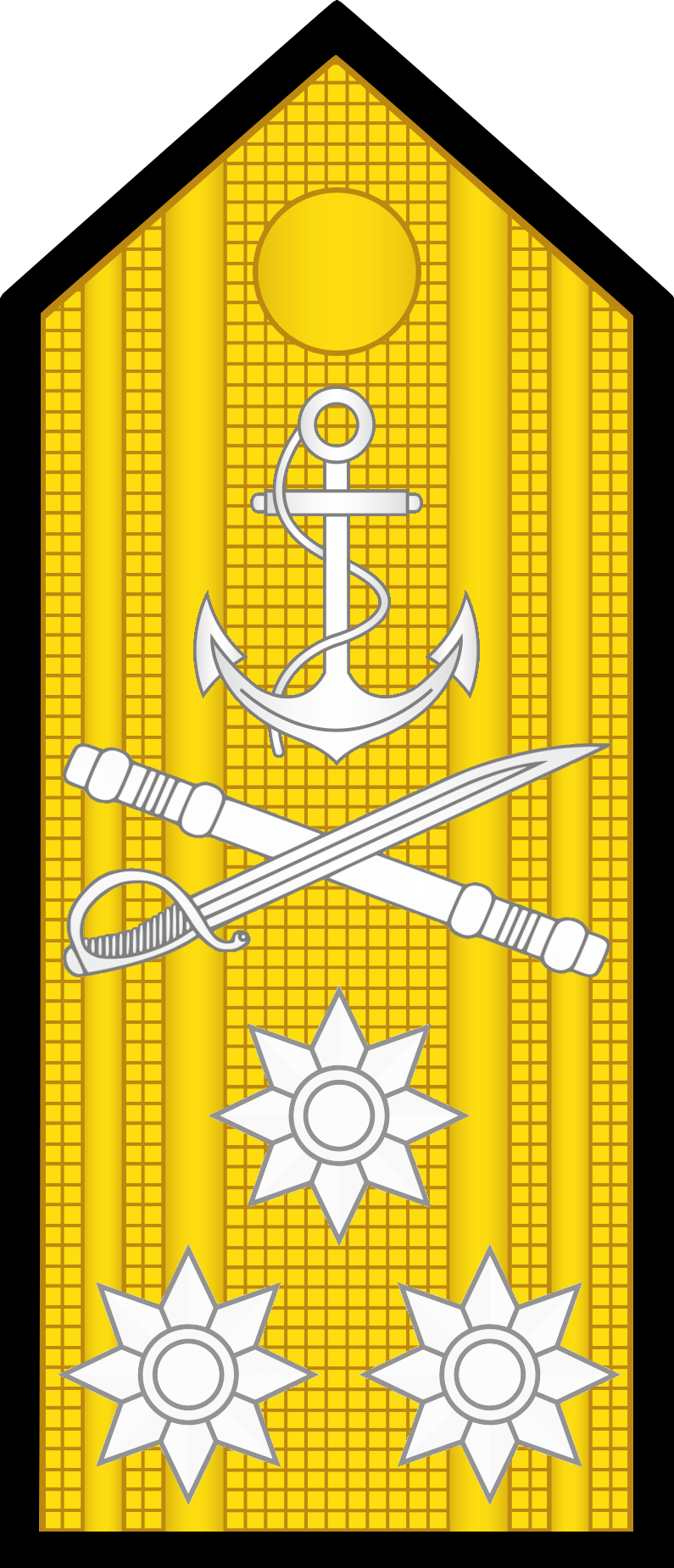
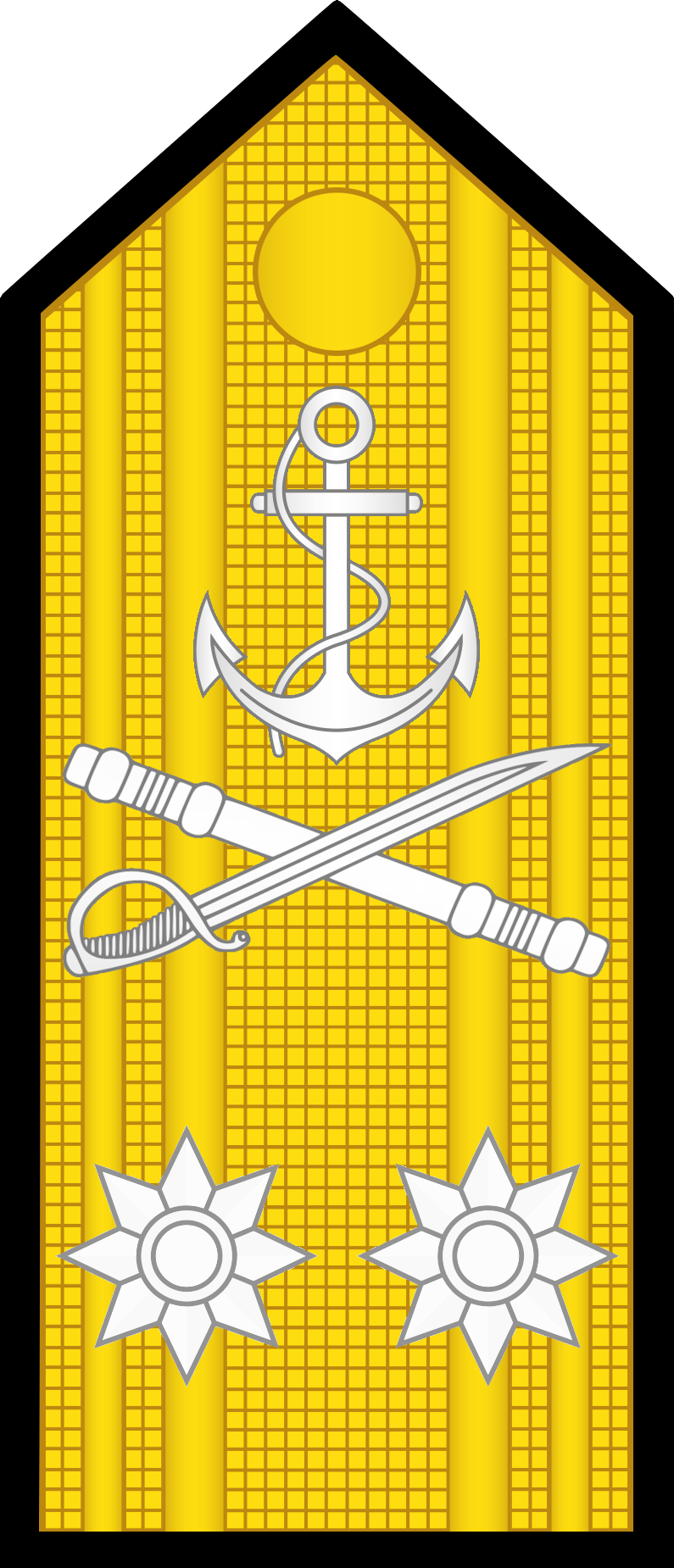
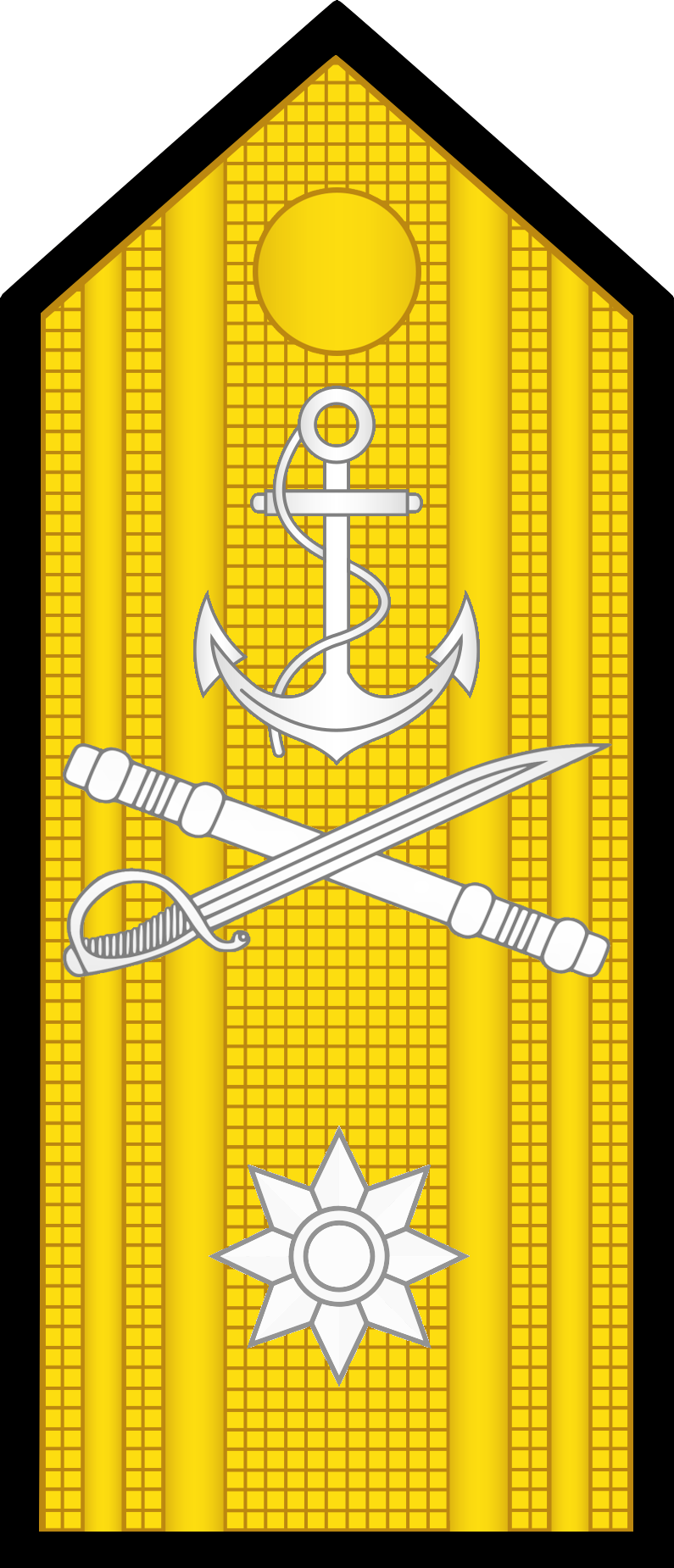
Rank group	General / flag officers			Senior officers			Junior officers
Cypriot Ground Forces
Cypriot Ground Forces	Αντιστράτηγος; Antistratigos	Υποστράτηγος; Ypostratigos	Ταξίαρχος; Taxiarchos	Συνταγματάρχης; Syntagmatarchis	Αντισυνταγματάρχης; Antisyntagmatarchis	Ταγματάρχης; Tagmatarchis	Λοχαγός; Lochagos	Υπολοχαγός; Ypolochagos	Ανθυπολοχαγός; Anthypolochagos
Cyprus Navy
Cyprus Navy	Αντιναύαρχος; Antinavarchos	Υποναύαρχος; Yponavarchos	Αρχιπλοίαρχος; Archiploiarchos	Πλοίαρχος; Ploiarchos	Αντιπλοίαρχος; Antiploiarchos	Πλωτάρχης; Plotarchis	Υποπλοίαρχος; Ypoploiarchos	Ανθυποπλοίαρχος; Anthypoploiarchos	Σημαιοφόρος; Simaioforos
Cyprus Air Forces
Cyprus Air Forces	Αντιπτέραρχος; Antipterarchos	Υποπτέραρχος; Ypopterarchos	Ταξίαρχος; Taxiarchos	Σμήναρχος; Sminarchos	Αντισμήναρχος; Antisminarchos	Επισμηναγός; Episminagos	Σμηναγός; Sminagos	Υποσμηναγός; Yposminagos	Ανθυποσμηναγός; Anthyposminagos
Rank group	General / flag officers			Senior officers			Junior officers

=== Student officer ranks ===
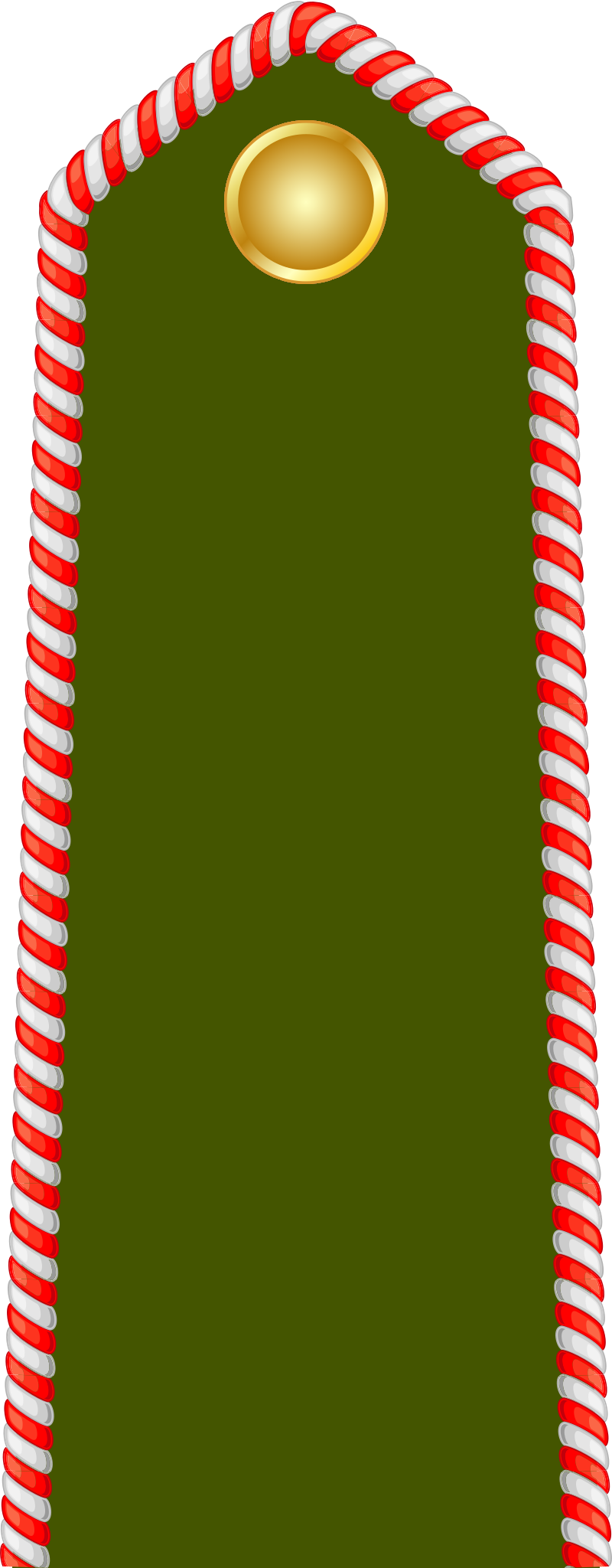
Rank group	Student officer
Cypriot Ground Forces
Cypriot Ground Forces	Δόκιμος Έφεδρος Αξιωματικός; Dókimos Éfedros Axiomatikós
Cyprus Navy
Cyprus Navy	Δόκιμος Έφεδρος Αξιωματικός; Dókimos Éfedros Axiomatikós
Cyprus Air Forces
Cyprus Air Forces	Δόκιμος Έφεδρος Αξιωματικός; Dókimos Éfedros Axiomatikós

== Other ranks ==
The rank insignia of non-commissioned officers and enlisted personnel.

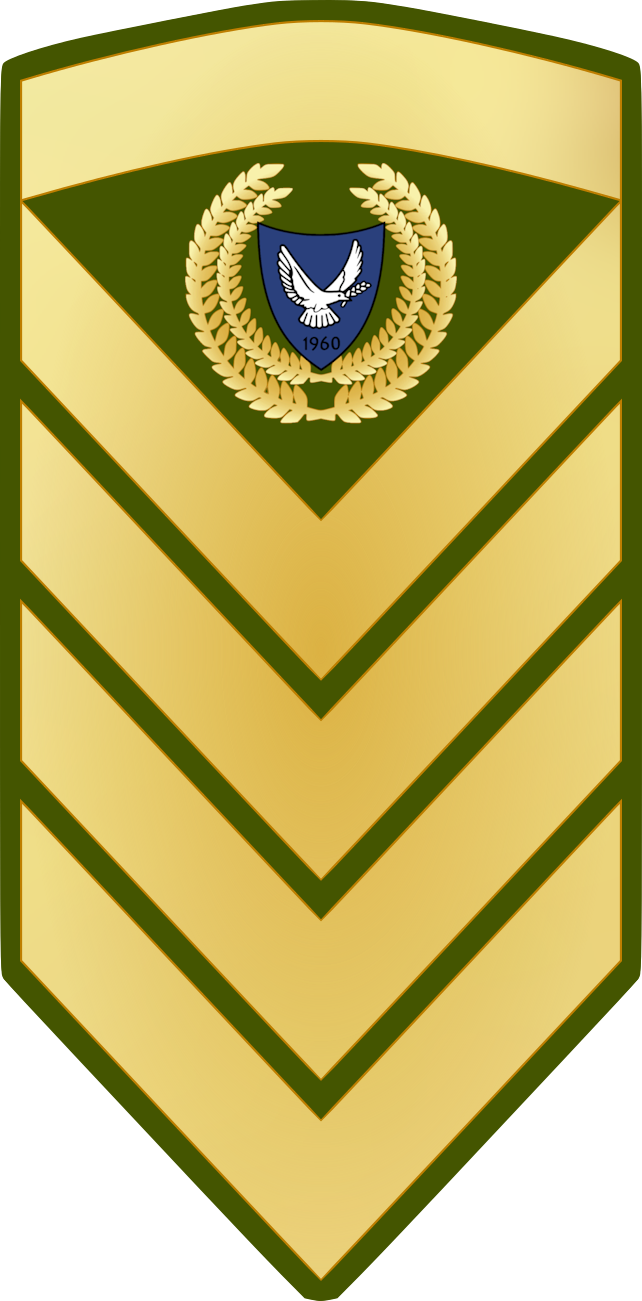
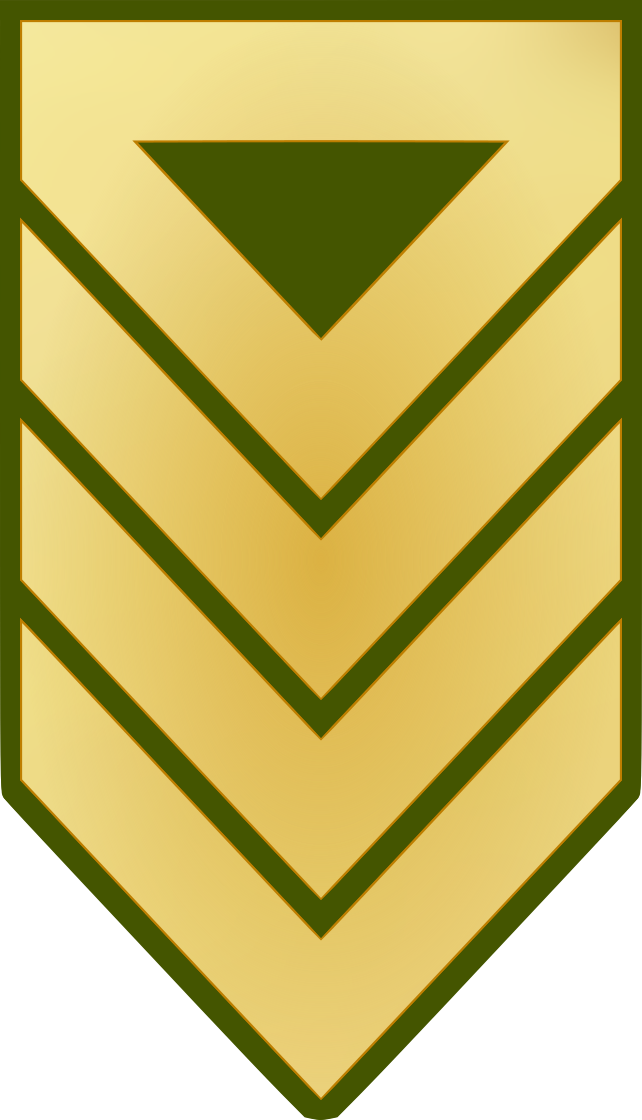
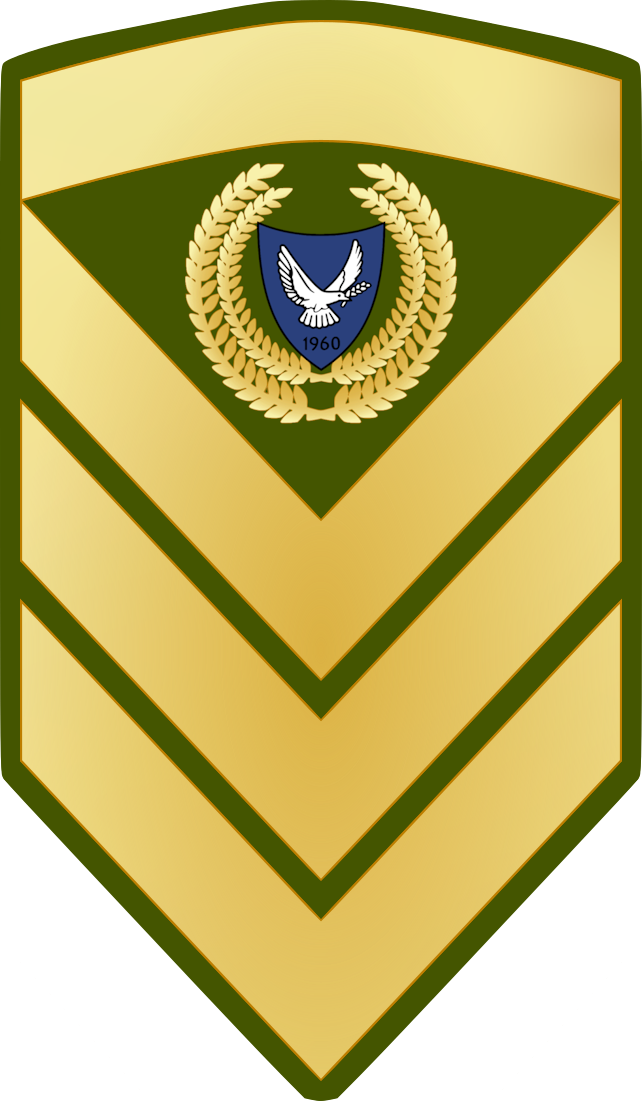
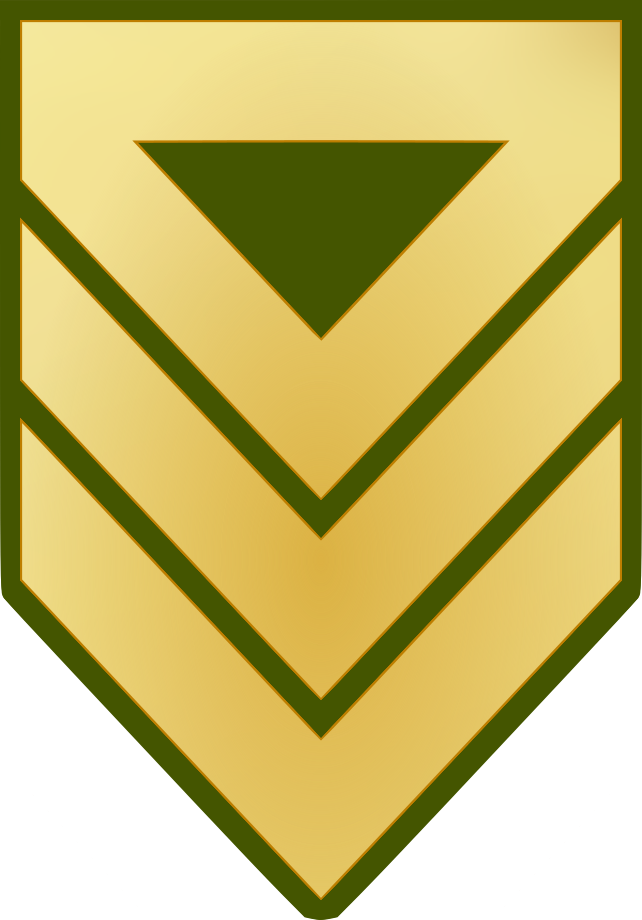
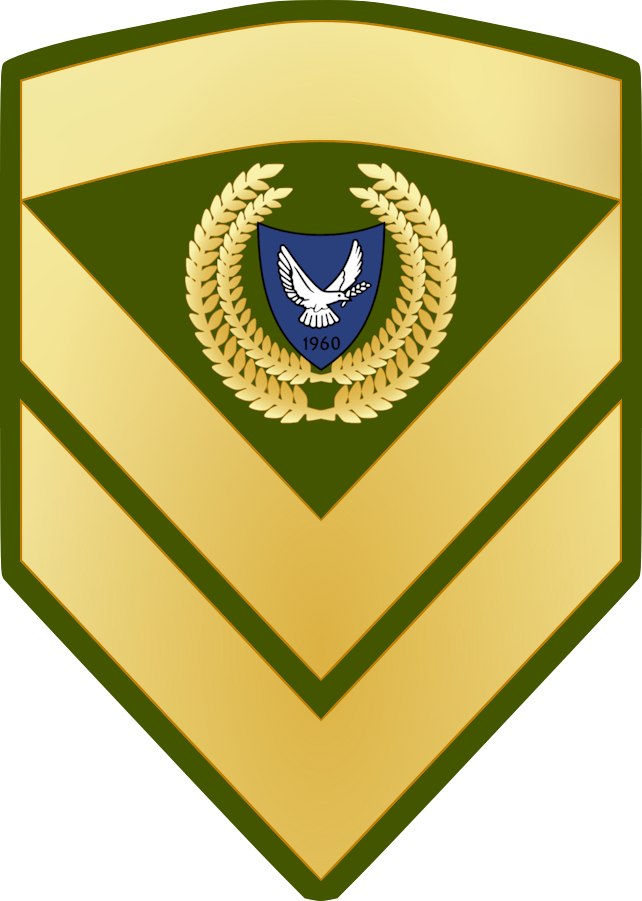
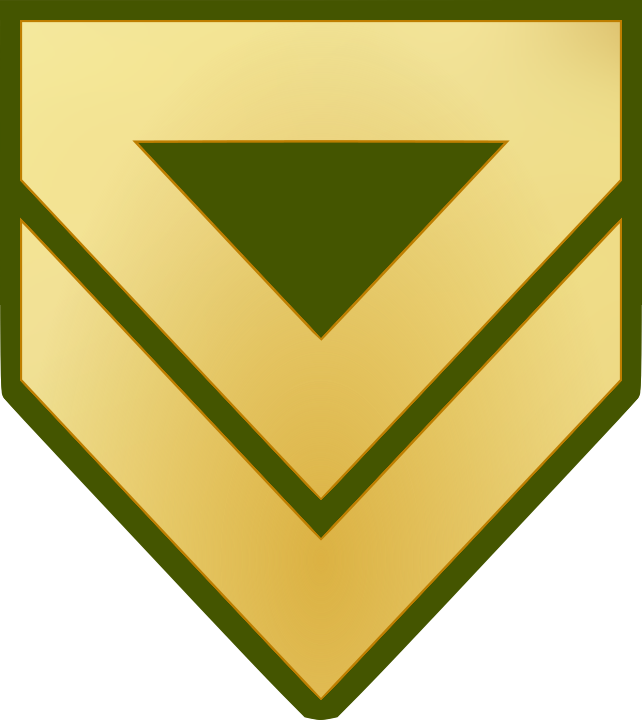
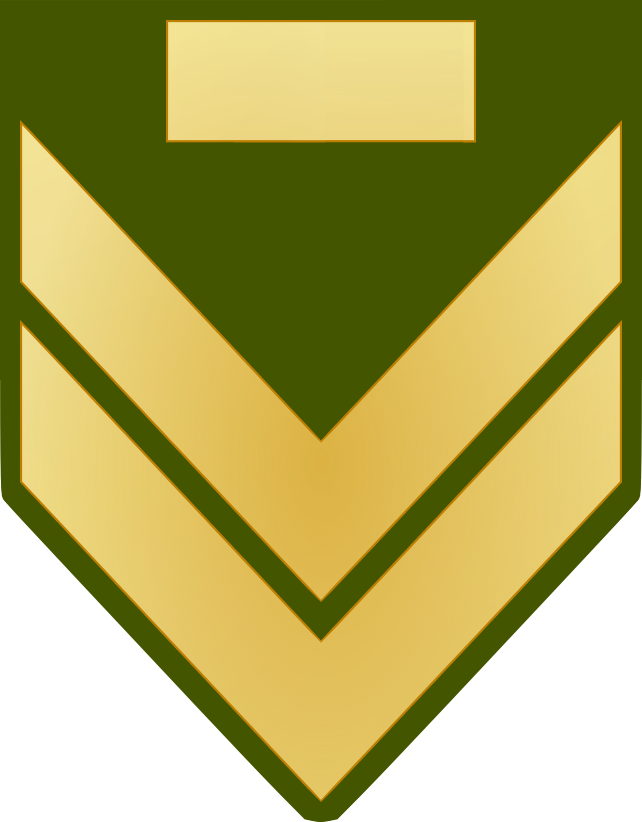
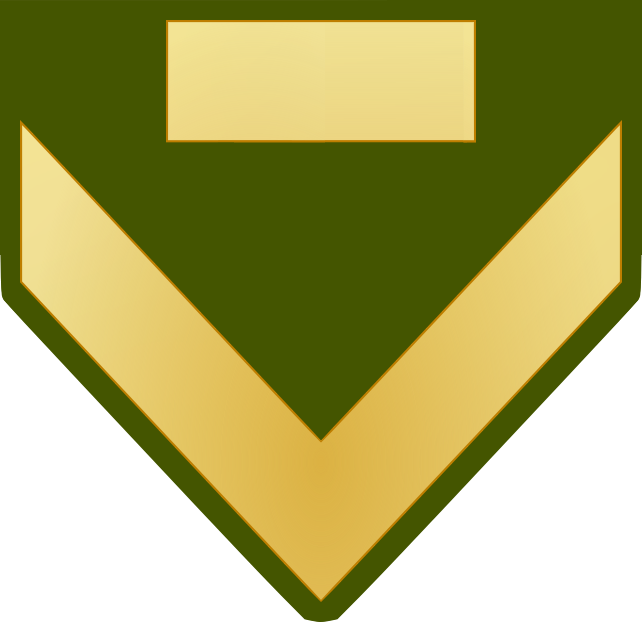
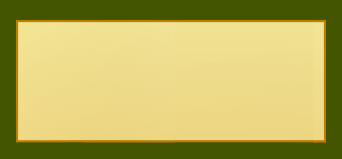
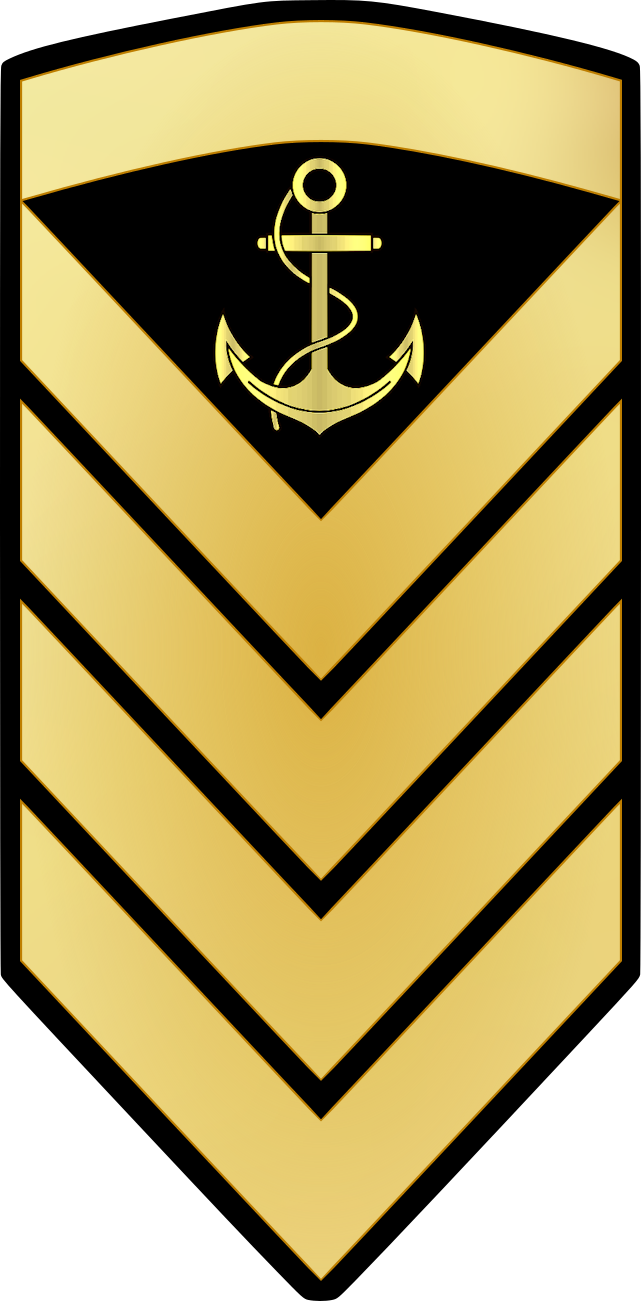
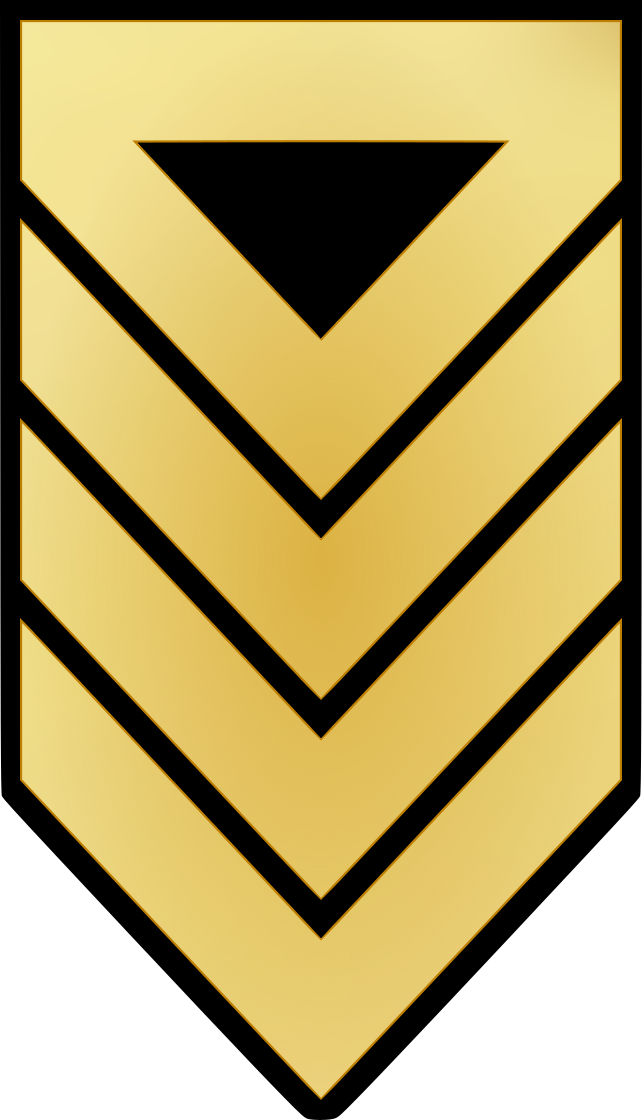
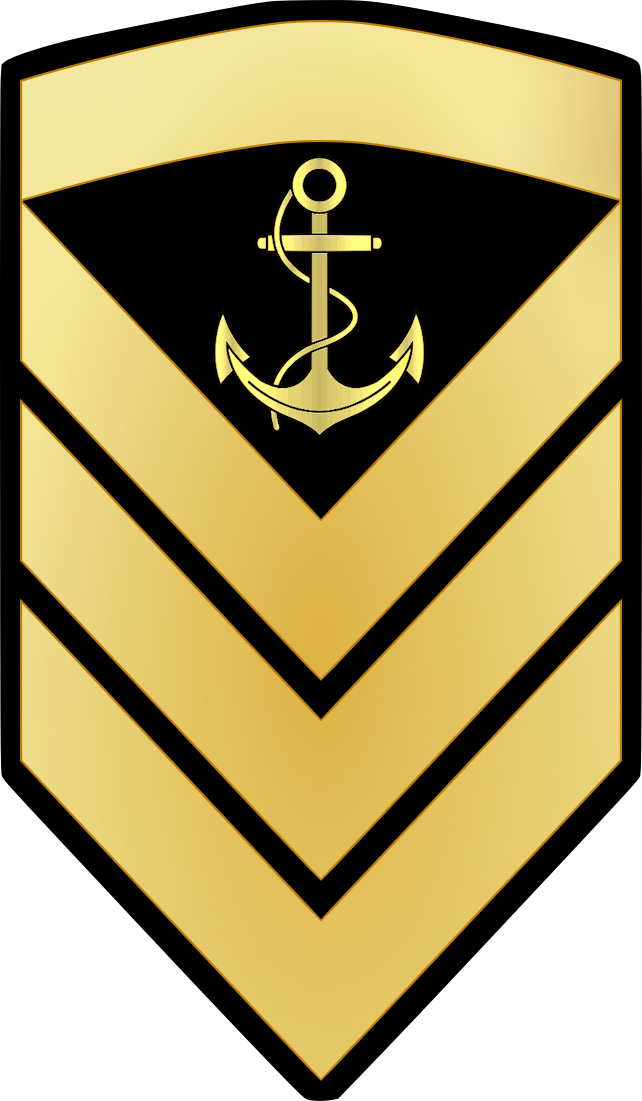
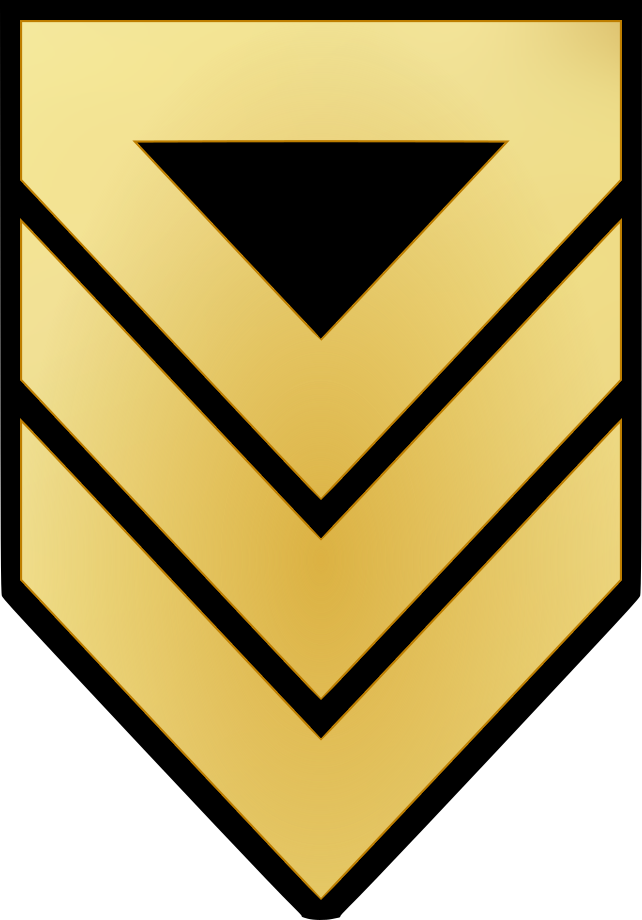
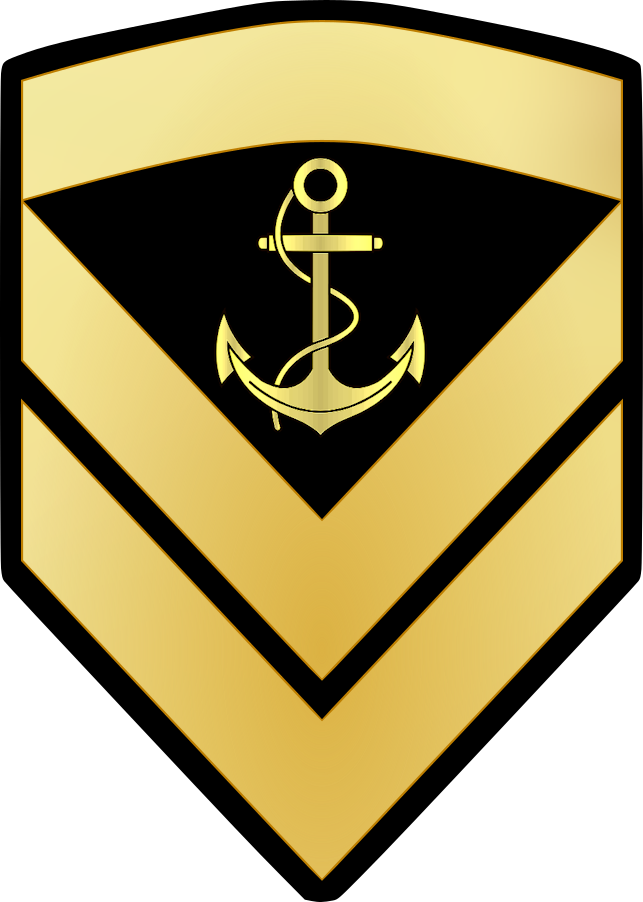
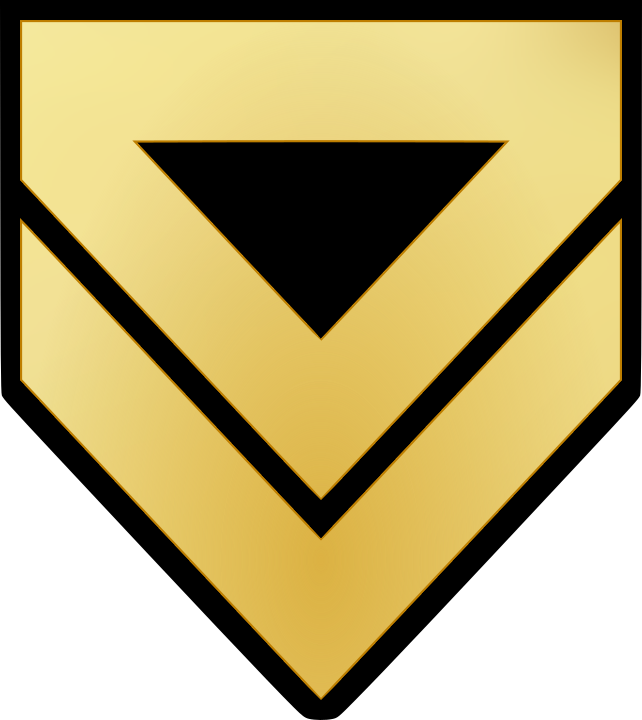
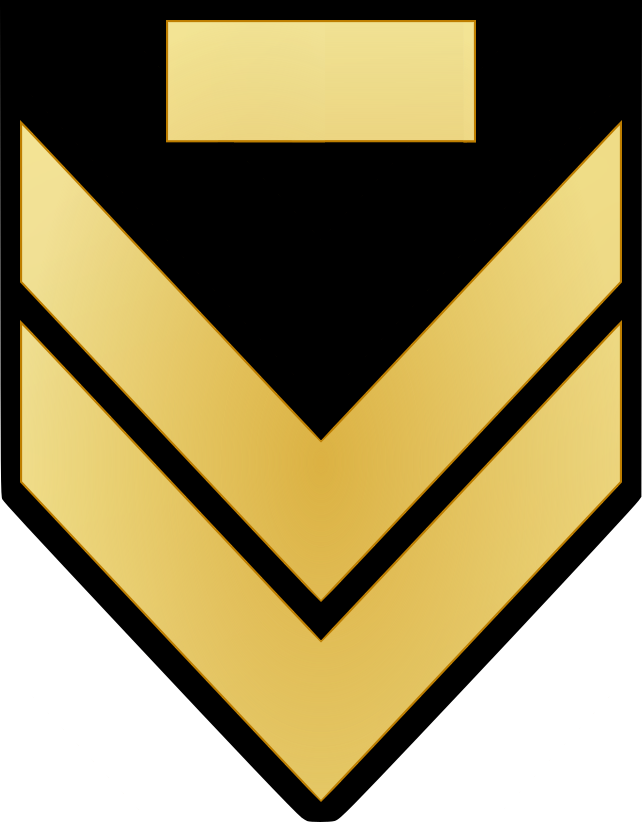
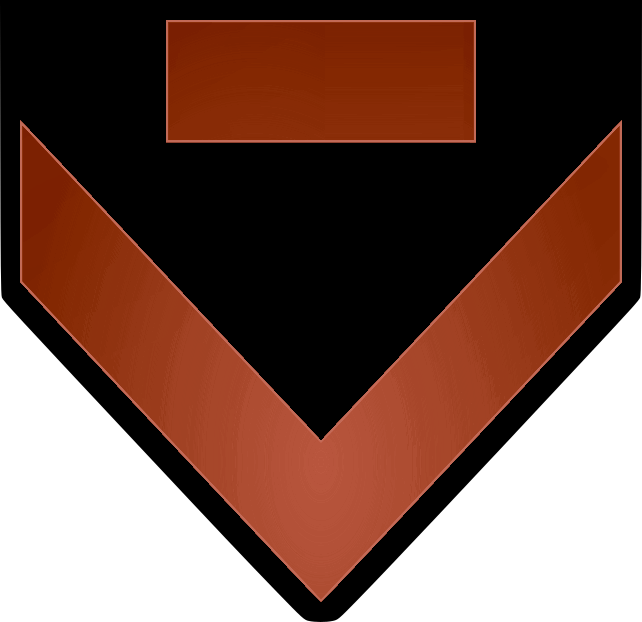
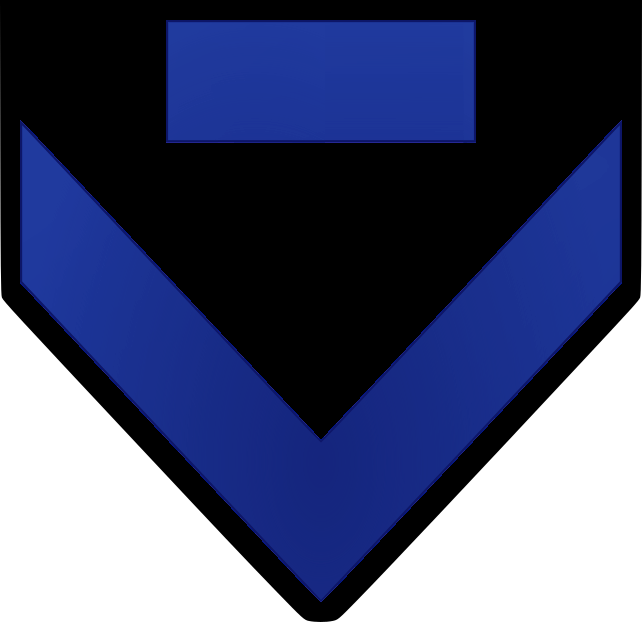
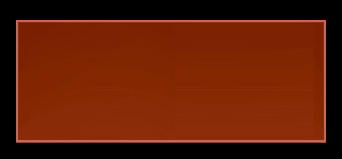
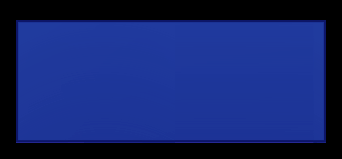
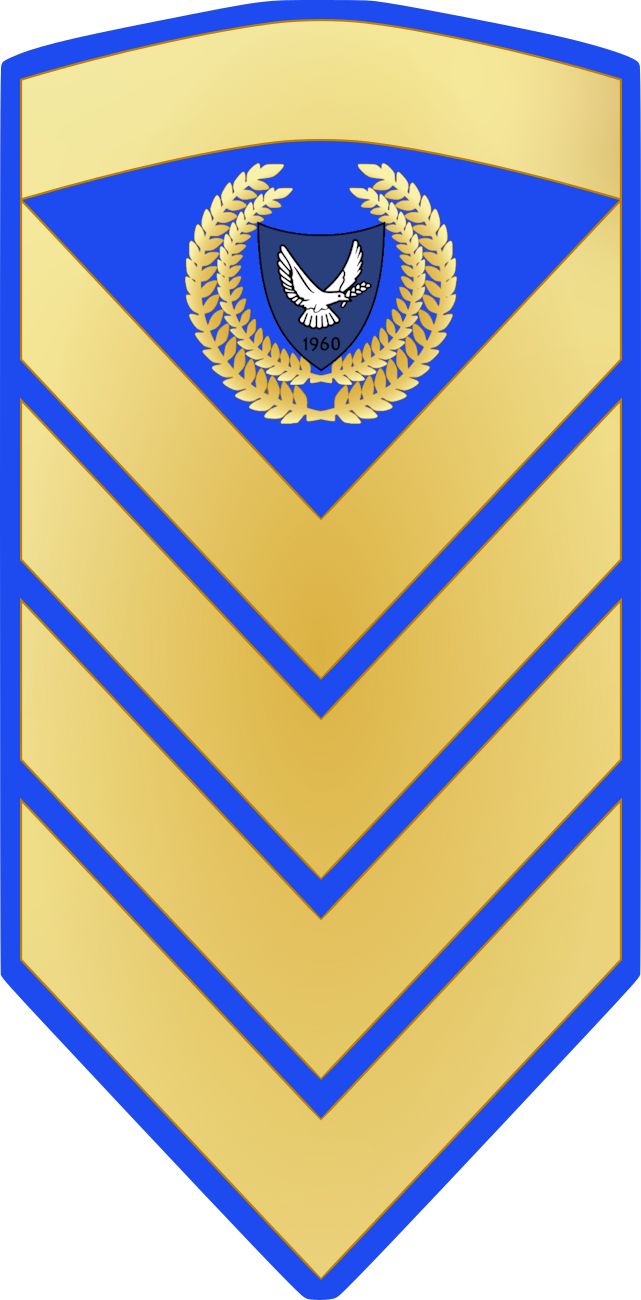
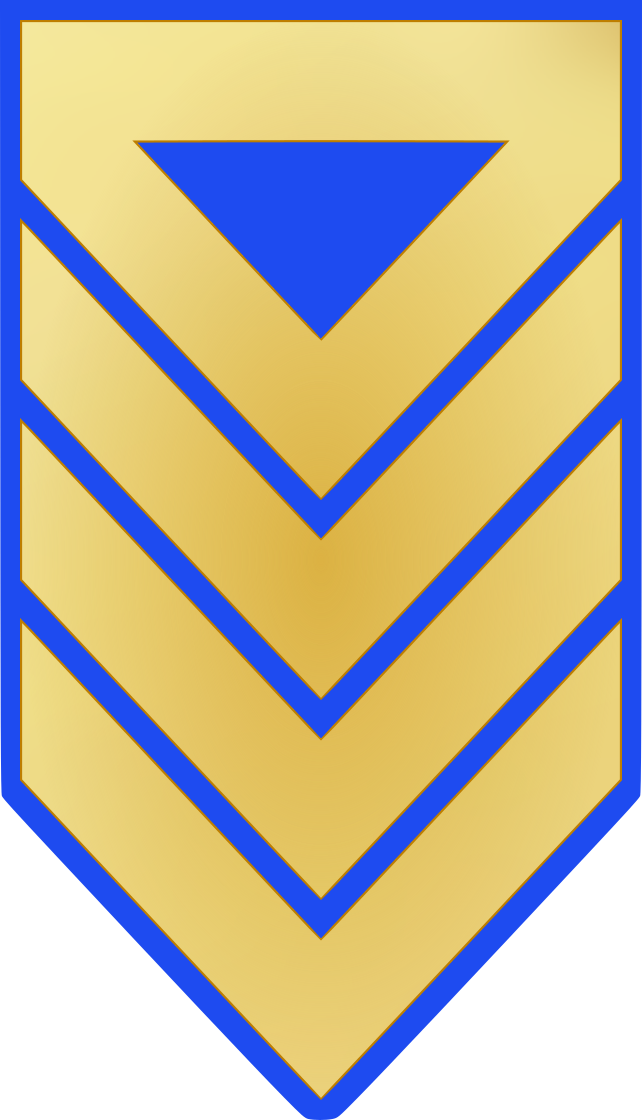
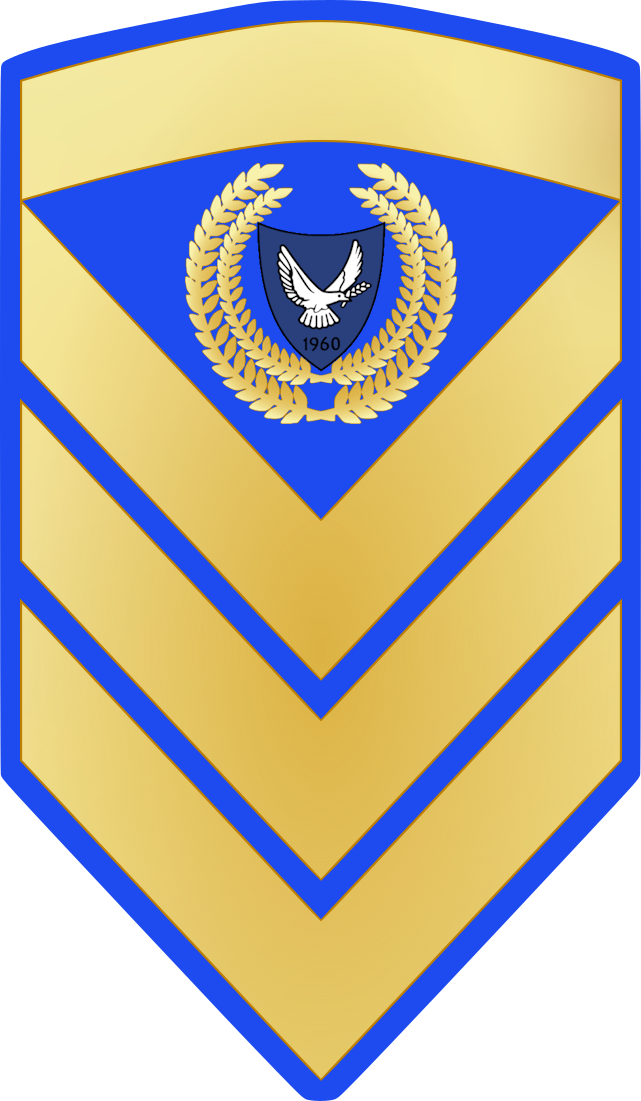
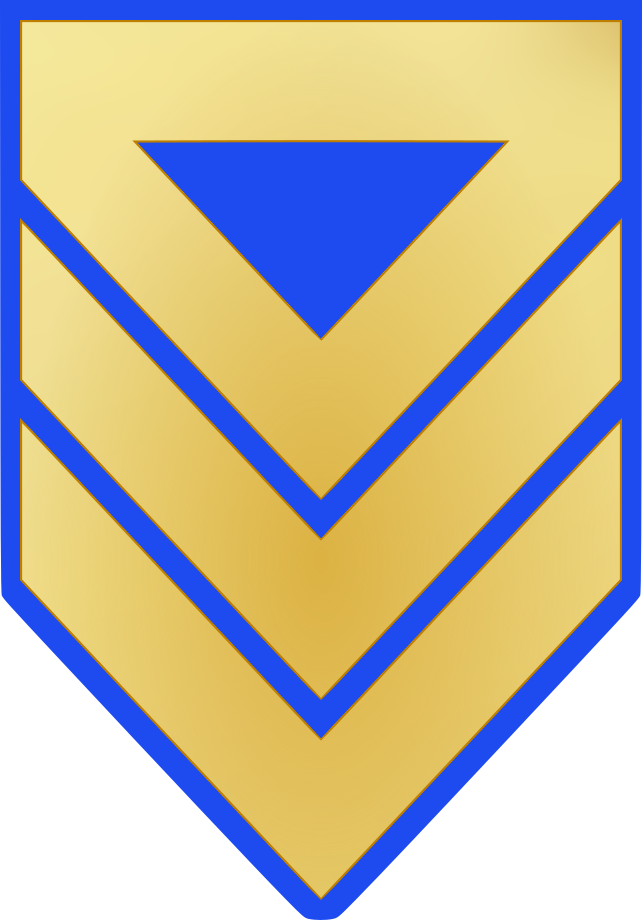
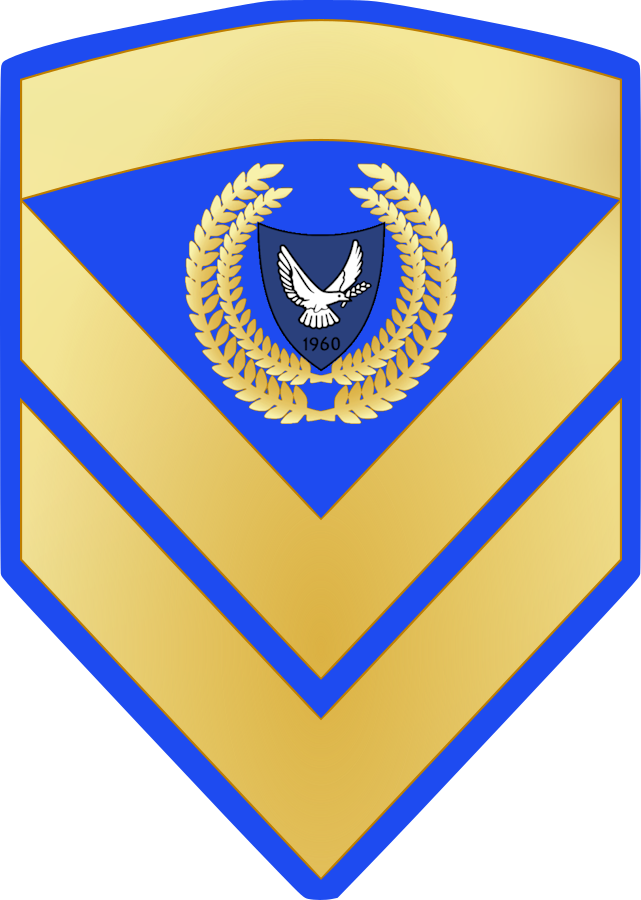
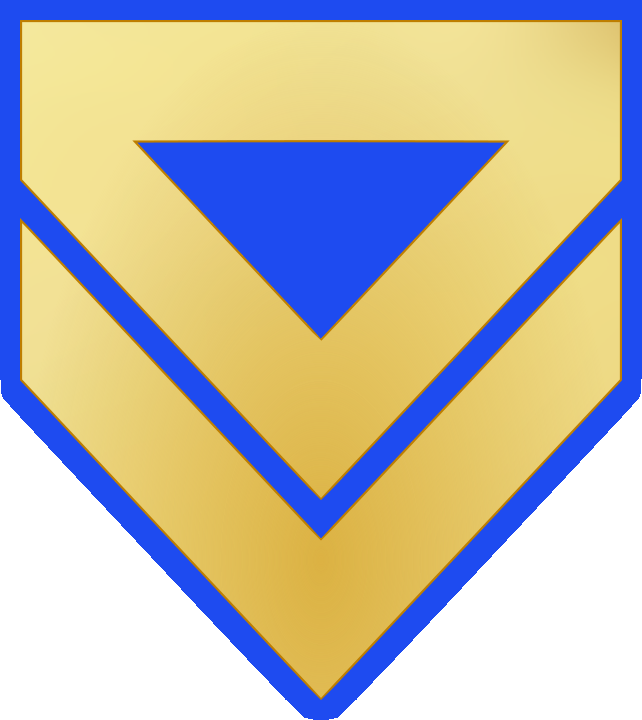
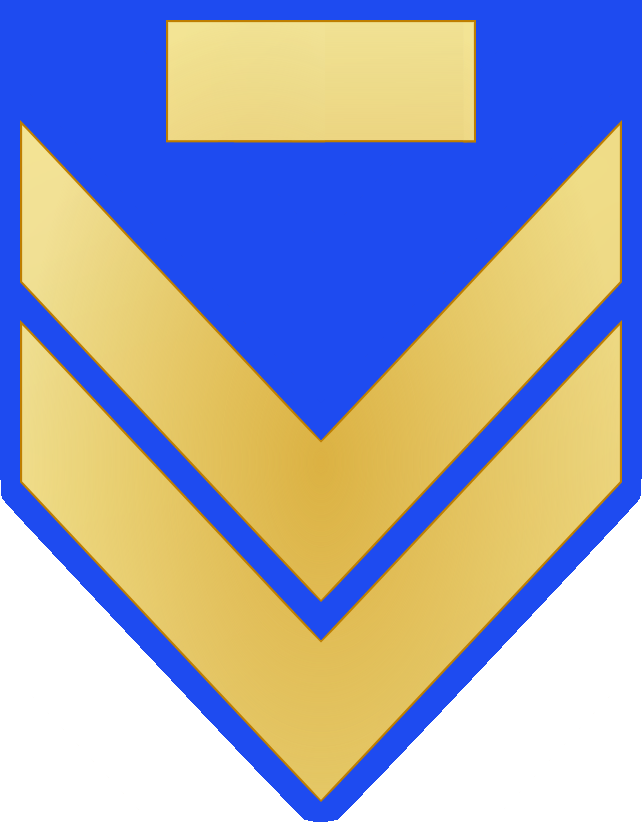
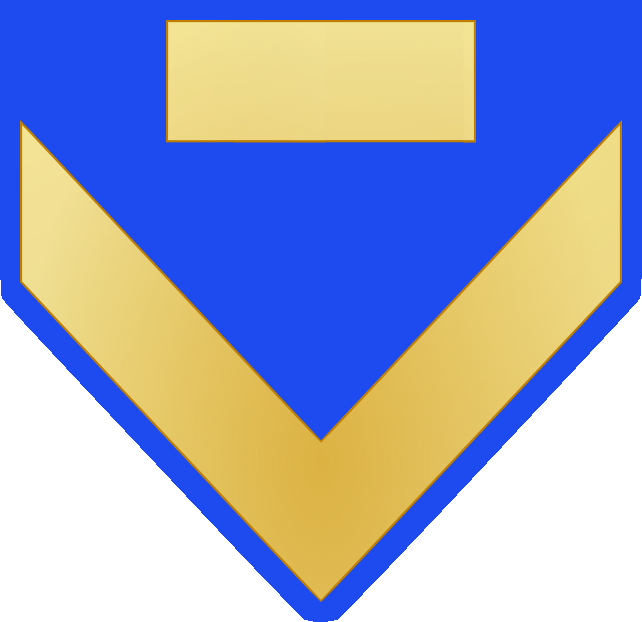
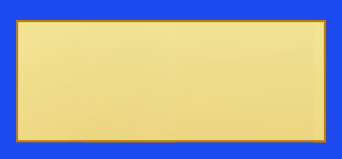
Rank group	Senior NCOs										Junior NCOs		Enlisted
Cypriot Ground Forces													Arm/corps insignia only
Cypriot Ground Forces	Ανθυπασπιστής Α΄ Anthypaspistís A'	Ανθυπασπιστής Β΄ Anthypaspistís V'	Ανθυπασπιστής Γ΄ Anthypaspistís G'	Αρχιλοχίας; Archilochías	Συπ Αρχιλοχίας; Syp Archilochías	Επιλοχίας; Epilochías	Συπ Επιλοχίας; Syp Epilochías	Λοχίας; Lochías	Συπ Λοχίας; Syp Lochías	Σιόπ Λοχίας; Syop Lochías	Δεκανέας; Dekanéas	Υποδεκανέας; Ypodekanéas	Στρατιώτης; Stratiótis
Cyprus Navy													Arm/corps insignia only
Cyprus Navy	Ανθυπασπιστής Α΄ Anthypaspistís A'	Ανθυπασπιστής Β΄ Anthypaspistís V'	Ανθυπασπιστής Γ΄ Anthypaspistís G'	Αρχικελευστής; Archikelefstís	Συπ Αρχικελευστής; Syp Archikelefstís	Επικελευστής; Epikelefstís	Συπ Επικελευστής; Syp Epikelefstís	Κελευστής; Kelefstís	Συπ Κελευστής; Syp Kelefstís	Σιόπ Κελευστής; Syop Kelefstís	Δίοπος; Díopos	Υποδίοπος; Ypodíopos	Ναύτης; Náftis
Cyprus Air Forces													Arm/corps insignia only
Cyprus Air Forces	Ανθυπασπιστής Α΄ Anthypaspistís A'	Ανθυπασπιστής Β΄ Anthypaspistís V'	Ανθυπασπιστής Γ΄ Anthypaspistís G'	Αρχισμηνίας; Archisminías	Συπ Αρχισμηνίας; Syp Archisminías	Επισμηνίας; Episminías	Συπ Επισμηνίας; Syp Episminías	Σμηνίας; Sminías	Συπ Σμηνίας; Syp Sminías	Σιόπ Σμηνίας; Syop Sminías	Υποσμηνίας; Yposminías	Ανθυποσμηνίας; Anthyposminías	Σμηνίτης; Sminítis
Rank group	Senior NCOs										Junior NCOs		Enlisted
