= Athalassa Airfield =

Former airfield in Nicosia, Cyprus

Athalassa Airfield
- Athalassa Barracks, Nicosia in Cyprus
- Declassified satellite imagery of the old Athalassa Airfield captured by KH-9 on 20 July, 1974.

Site information
- Owner: Republic of Cyprus
- Operator: Cyprus Air Command
- Condition: Demolished

Location
- Shown within Cyprus
- Coordinates: 35°08′55″N 33°22′57″E

Site history
- Built: 1964

Airfield information
Runways
Direction	Length and surface
E/W	1,400 metres (4,593 ft) Asphalt

Athalassa Airfield was an airfield located in the Athalassa Barracks, Nicosia in Cyprus. It was established in 1964 and initially served as the base for the Cyprus Air Detachment.

== History ==
Prior to existing as an airstrip, Athalassa served as a military headquarters and signals base. On 10 May 1941, the 1st King's Dragoon Guards relocated its main camp to Athalassa, bringing 15 light tanks, carriers, and 45 trucks, lorries, and cars. The camp was shared with the 1st Sherwood Foresters, C Special Service Battalion, Cyprus Volunteer Force, and field artillery. On 1 March 1942, the No. 25 Sector Operations Room (SOR) was established at Athalassa, handling the fighter-control system for Cyprus. By 1944, Athalassa housed the Regional Flying Control.

In May 1964, private land was acquired for the development of Athalassa Airfield. The government compensated the landowner by offering government-owned land elsewhere, handled through April 1965. Following establishment, Air Commodore P. Thomopoulos arrived at Cyprus on 5 May 1964. He investigated whether an air component could be established in Cyprus, surveying the availability of runways at Tymbou, Lakatamia, and Geroskipou. Athalassa Airfield appeared as an ideal solution. At the time, there was an abandoned Boeing-Stearman Model 75 there, reportedly given to Archbishop Makarios by Germany for agricultural spraying. Subsequently, in June 1964, the Cyprus Air Detachment was established and based at Athalassa after restoring two aircraft present there. Wing Commander N. Tsintavís was appointed as the first commander, with Pilot Officer P. Leoutséas serving as its senior technical officer. A year later, the unit was upgraded to become the Cyprus Air Command. The 1965 Aphrodite Plan classified Athalassa as a main airport, alongside Lakatamia, Tymbou, and Nicosia.

Athalassa Airfield still appeared on the 1969 revised edition of the Nicosia South topographic map. It was evidently abandoned by July 1974, appearing to have been redeveloped.

== Accidents & incidents ==
- In July 1966, a Cypriot police single-engine Piper Colt crashed at the airfield, injuring the pilot, Police Sub-Inspector Papadopoulos.
