= Aerostar =

Aerostar or Aero Star may refer to:

== Transportation ==
- Aerostar (Romanian company), an aeronautical manufacturing company
- Aerostar Aircraft Corporation, an American aircraft manufacturer owned by Butler Aviation International, operated 1969–1973
- Aerostar Aircraft Corporation, an American aircraft maintenance company that provides support for the Piper Aerostar, formed 1991
- Aerostar Airlines, a Ukrainian business jet charter company
- Aerostar Airport Holdings, a Puerto Rican airport authority
- Aerostar Industries, a former division of Raven Industries that manufactured civil and military aerostats
- Aerostar Tactical UAS, an Israeli unmanned aerial vehicle
- Ford Aerostar, an American minivan built 1985–1997
- Mitsubishi Fuso Aero Star, a family of Japanese passenger buses
- Piper Aerostar, originally the Ted Smith Aerostar, an American light aircraft

== Sport ==
- Aero Star, a Mexican wrestler
- CS Aerostar Bacău, a Romanian football club
- Aerostar Stadium, in Bacău, Romania

== Other uses ==
- Aerostar (video game), 1991
