= Cyprus Air Command =

Air warfare branch of Cyprus' military

Air Command of Cyprus
- Διοίκηση Αεροπορίας Κύπρου (Greek)
- Cyprus Air Force emblem
- Founded: 1964
- Country: Cyprus
- Branch: Air force
- Role: Aerial warfare
- Size: 1,200 personnel 15 helicopters, 3 fixed wing aircraft, 4 unmanned aerial vehicles. On order: 2 helicopters + 4 UAVs
- Part of: Cypriot National Guard
- Engagements: 2026 Iran war: 2026 Iranian strikes on Akrotiri and Dhekelia

Commanders
- Current commander: Βrigadier General George Alexandrou

Insignia
- Roundel

- Fin flash

Aircraft flown
- Helicopter: Airbus H145
- Utility helicopter: Aérospatiale Gazelle, AgustaWestland AW139, Bell 206
- Reconnaissance: Aerostar, IAI Searcher
- Transport: Embraer ERJ-135
- Firefighting Aircraft: Air Tractor AT-802

The Cyprus Air Command (Greek: Διοίκηση Αεροπορίας Κύπρου, romanized: Dioikisi Aeroporias Kyprou, Turkish: Kıbrıs Hava Komutanlığı), also known as the Cyprus Air Force or Cypriot Air Force, is the armed air wing of the National Guard. This force is equipped with attack and anti-tank helicopters, surface-to-air missile systems and integrated radar systems.

== History ==
The history of Cypriot aviation began on 16 August 1960, after it won its independence from the United Kingdom, when an Air Wing was established on the island which. It was equipped with a small number of light aircraft and mainly performed search and rescue tasks (SAR), transport of the sick, control of fires and marine pollution as well as defense and police forces on the Cypriot coast and territory.

Until 1987, the aircraft of the Cypriot aviation still operated with civilian brands, as the usual military nature of the young air force had not yet developed. In the same year, 3 light helicopters Bell 206, 4 utility helicopters Aérospatiale Gazelle and 2 intermediate trainers Pilatus PC-9.

From this moment on, the Cypriot air force began to adopt for its aircraft a camouflage livery and nationality insignia with the national flag and the cockade that follows that of Greece.

In July 2022, the Cypriot government announced that six Eurocopter EC145 helicopters would be procured from Airbus with an option for six more. These helicopters would cover the roles of reconnaissance and attack. They will be replacing the ageing Mil Mi-24 helicopters in service which are hard and costly to maintain. Turkish Cypriot authorities have called the helicopter purchase as a "provocation". The helicopters arrived in March 2025.

In March 2026, the air defenses of the Air Command were placed on alert following the strikes in Iran, working with Greek and assisting British forces in tracking aerial threats against the island including the Sovereign Base Areas where British forces failed to intercept shahed drones which impacted RAF Akrotiri.

== Organisation ==
The Cyprus Air Force consists of two aircraft squadrons. Note that the aircraft of the Cyprus Police operate under a separate command-structure during peacetime.

- 450th Attack Helicopter Squadron (450 M.E/P)
- 460th Search And Rescue Squadron (460 MED)

== Air Force bases and stations ==
- Andreas Papandreou AFB, Paphos (ACTIVE)

The primary airbase of the Cyprus Air Force, this base adjacent to the Paphos International Airport has a runway, taxiway, hardened aircraft-shelters, and integrated command, control and communication facilities.

- Lakatamia AFB, Nicosia (HEADQUARTERS)

The reserve airbase of the Cyprus Air Force lay just south of the Cypriot capital of Nicosia. The base rarely hosted fixed-wing aircraft, and simply served as a staging-post for helicopters operating in and out of the Nicosia area.

- Troodos Stations (ACTIVE)

The Troodos Mountains, the highest mountain range in Cyprus, hosts a number of radar and air-defense facilities. Their unit designations and deployment status are not made public.

== Equipment ==
=== Aircraft ===
Aircraft	Origin	Type	Photo	Variant	In service	Notes
Fixed-wing aircraft
Embraer ERJ-135	Brazil	VIP transport		EMB-135BJ	1	Donated by Greece to Cyprus in September 2022. The aircraft is used to transport the President of the Republic and other government officials.
Air Tractor AT-802	United States	Firefighting			2	Transferred in February 2025 from the Department of Forests to the newly created fire-fighting unit of the National Guard. 3,1 ton water tank capacity.
Helicopters
Airbus H145	France; Germany	Armed Reconnaissance Helicopter		H145M	5	Another 1 on order with an option to buy an additional 6. First 4 delivered in 2025. Equipped with the HForce weapons system. Carrying 12,7mm machine gun and 12 rocket pot. It may also carry Spike ER missiles in the future.
Aérospatiale Gazelle	France	Utility/Anti-tank		Gazelle SA 342L	4	Armed with 4 HOT Anti-tank Guided Missiles.
AgustaWestland AW139	Italy	SAR/Utility		AW139	3	Used primarily for Search and Rescue (SAR) in coordination with JRCC Larnaca.
Bell 206	United States	Utility/Transport		LongRanger III	2	Three acquired from Belgian source in the 1980s. One lost in crash in 2003.
Unmanned aerial vehicles
Aerostar	Israel	Surveillance/Recon			4	In service since 2019. +4 on order.
IAI Searcher	Israel	Surveillance/Recon			2	
Swarmly Poseidon H-10	Cyprus	Surveillance/Recon/VTOL				Used by the artillery Brigade for recon and target designation. Entered service 2025.

Retired aircraft include the Mil Mi-35P.

=== Air defense ===
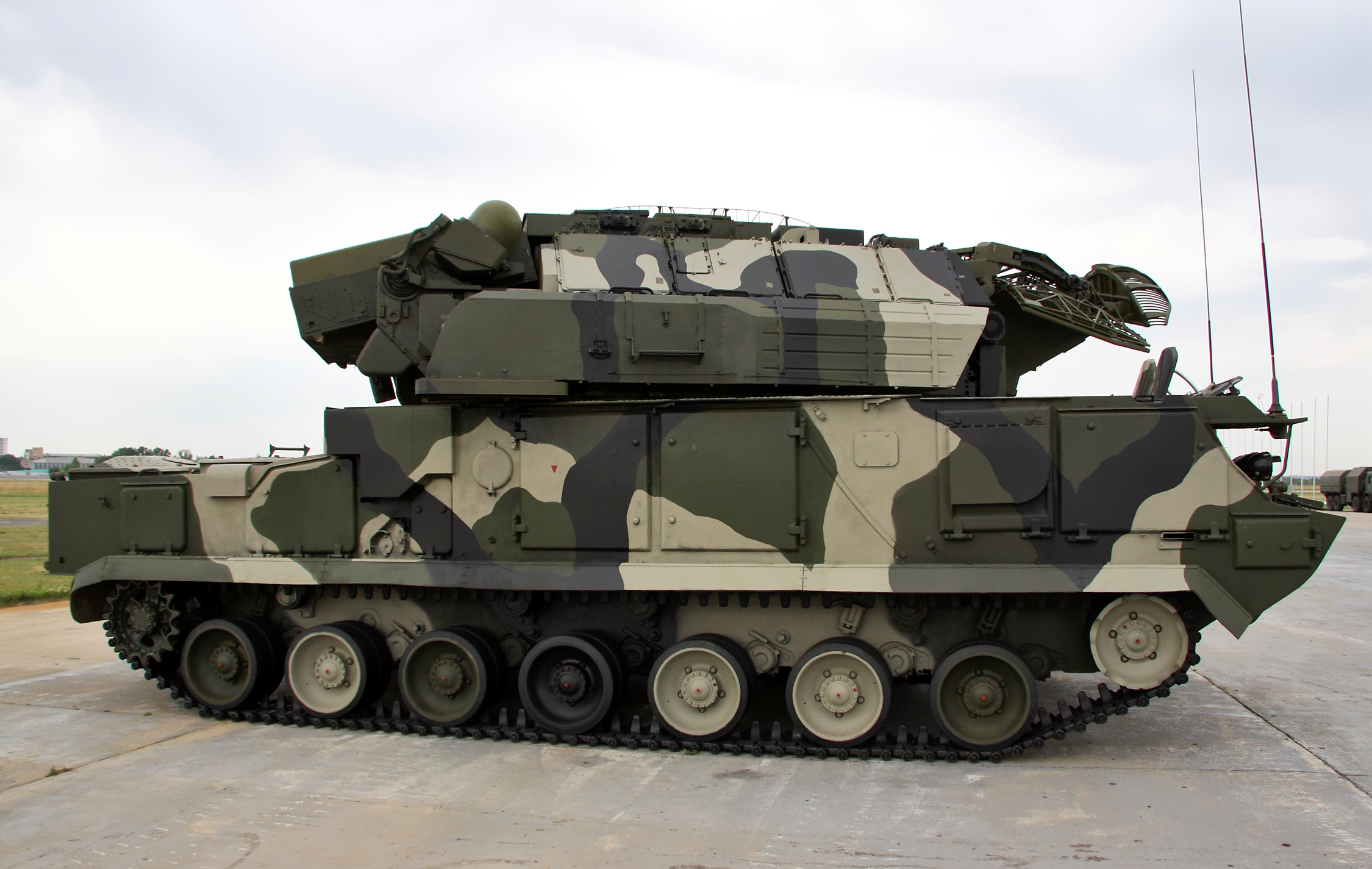
A Tor-M1 surface-to-air missile system

Name	Origin	Type	Photo	In service	Notes
Surface-to-air missiles
Barak MX	Israel	Surface-to-air missile system		Possibly 2 batteries.	In operation as of December 2024.
Aspide	Italy	Surface-to-air missile system		24	6 batteries/130 missiles. Utilized with the Skyguard system (Othellos) using Oerlikon GDF 35mm. 12 Skyguard radars.
Mistral	France	Man-portable air defense system	Cypriot SHORAD	30 (300 missiles)	18 Mistral MANPADS and 12 x2 Mistral ATLAS system mounted on Pinzgauer utility vehicles. More than 300 missiles. More missile on order as of June 2023.
TOR M-1	Soviet Union Russia	Surface-to-air missile system		6	Delivered by Greece in replacement for the S-300.~150 missiles.
Buk M1-2	Soviet Union Russia	Surface-to-air missile system		8	Total number of systems is unknown. Possibly 2 batteries with 4 systems each.
9K32 Strela-2	Soviet Union Russia	Man-portable air defense system		100	Operational numbers may be less.
9S737M Ranzhir-M	Russia	Mobile command center		Unknown	Mobile Command Centre for the coordination of the TOR air defense network system
Anti-aircraft artillery
GDF-005	Switzerland	Anti-aircraft gun		24	2x35mm anti-aircraft gun. Part of the Skyguard (Othellos) system along Aspide SAMs.
Zastava M-55	Yugoslavia	Anti-aircraft gun		50	3x20mm anti-aircraft gun.

In 1998 two S-300 PMU1 systems were delivered, but then transferred to Hellenic Air Force that same year due to political considerations regarding the Cyprus Missile Crisis.

== Aerial incidents between Cyprus and Turkey ==
=== Paphos Incident – 22 October 2000 ===
On 22 October 2000, Tor-M1 air-defense batteries operated by the Cyprus National Guard at Papandreou Air Base tracked a pair of Turkish warplanes detected approaching the airbase by "locking on" to them. By Jean Christou, Cyprus Mail, 7 April 2002. The action of engaging the Turkish aircraft with radar forced the warplanes to retreat from the area, as Greek Cypriot and Greek forces conducted joint military maneuvers in the Paphos region. The incident prompted an angry outburst from the Turkish Cypriot leader, Rauf Denktaş, who was reported in the media to have condemned the radar lock-on as a provocation that could lead to war.

=== Paphos Incident – 5 April 2002 ===
It was variously reported in the Cyprus media that combat radars of the Cyprus National Guard, based at Papandreou Air Base in Paphos, had tracked two Turkish F-16 warplanes at 11am on 5 April 2002, by "locking-on" to them. The two Turkish aircraft were reported to have incurred into the Nicosia Flight Information Region and then passed directly over the Greek Cypriot airbase at an altitude of 3500 feet. Upon realizing that they were being tracked, the two Turkish aircraft turned back towards Turkey, and then returned to their airbase.

=== Cyprus EEZ - 18 August 2022 ===
On 18 August 2022, Cypriot and Greek radars spotted a Turkish Navy ATR 72 whilst flying over Block 6 of the exclusive economic zone of Cyprus. According to media sources, the plane did a low pass at 4,500 feet, however a Cypriot official claimed that the plane did no such thing and remained at 29,000.

== Ranks ==
=== Commissioned officer ranks ===
The rank insignia of commissioned officers.

Rank group	General / flag officers			Senior officers			Junior officers
Cyprus Air Forces
Cyprus Air Forces	Αντιπτέραρχος; Antipterarchos	Υποπτέραρχος; Ypopterarchos	Ταξίαρχος; Taxiarchos	Σμήναρχος; Sminarchos	Αντισμήναρχος; Antisminarchos	Επισμηναγός; Episminagos	Σμηναγός; Sminagos	Υποσμηναγός; Yposminagos	Ανθυποσμηναγός; Anthyposminagos

=== Other ranks ===
The rank insignia of non-commissioned officers and enlisted personnel.

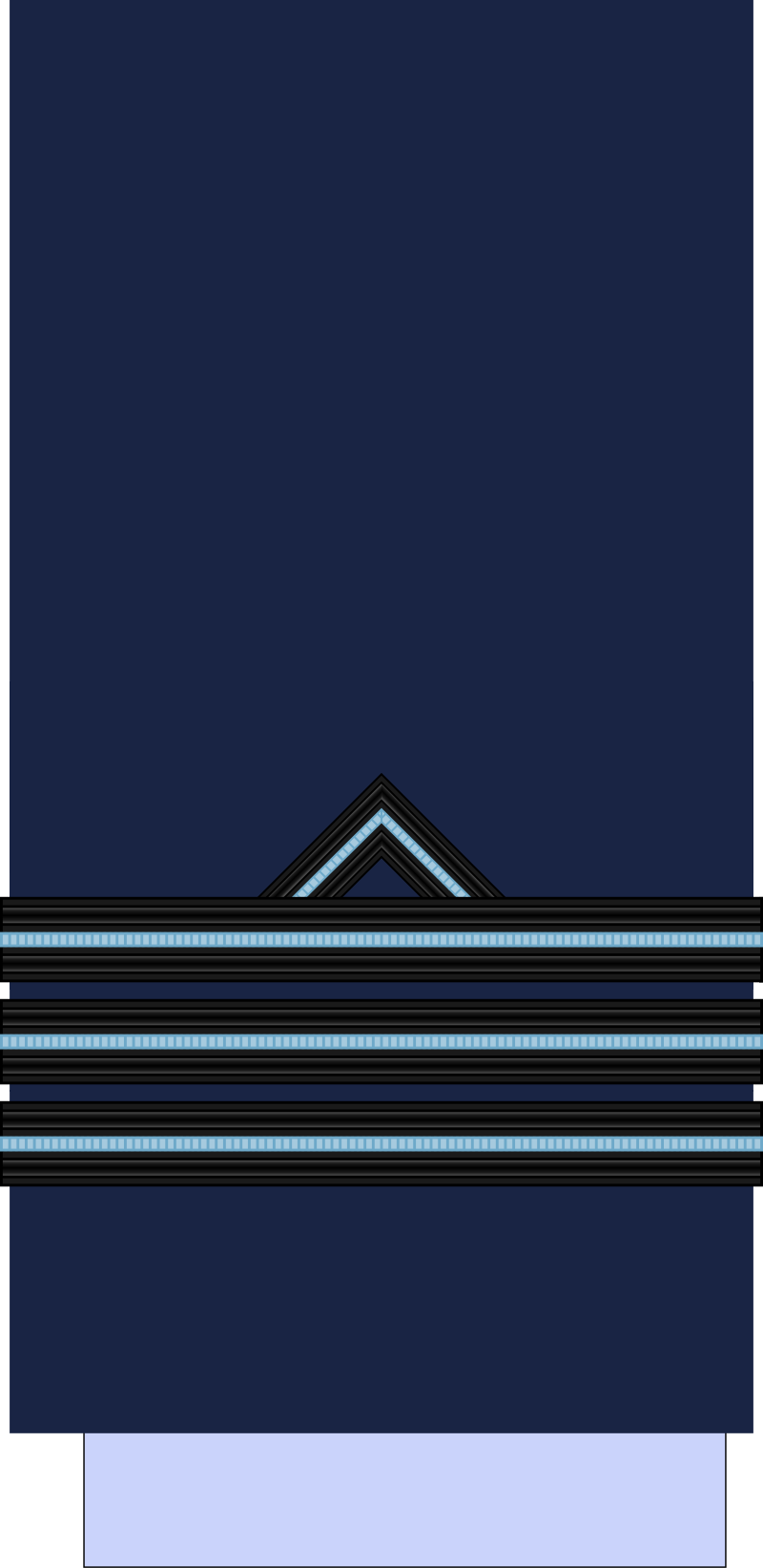
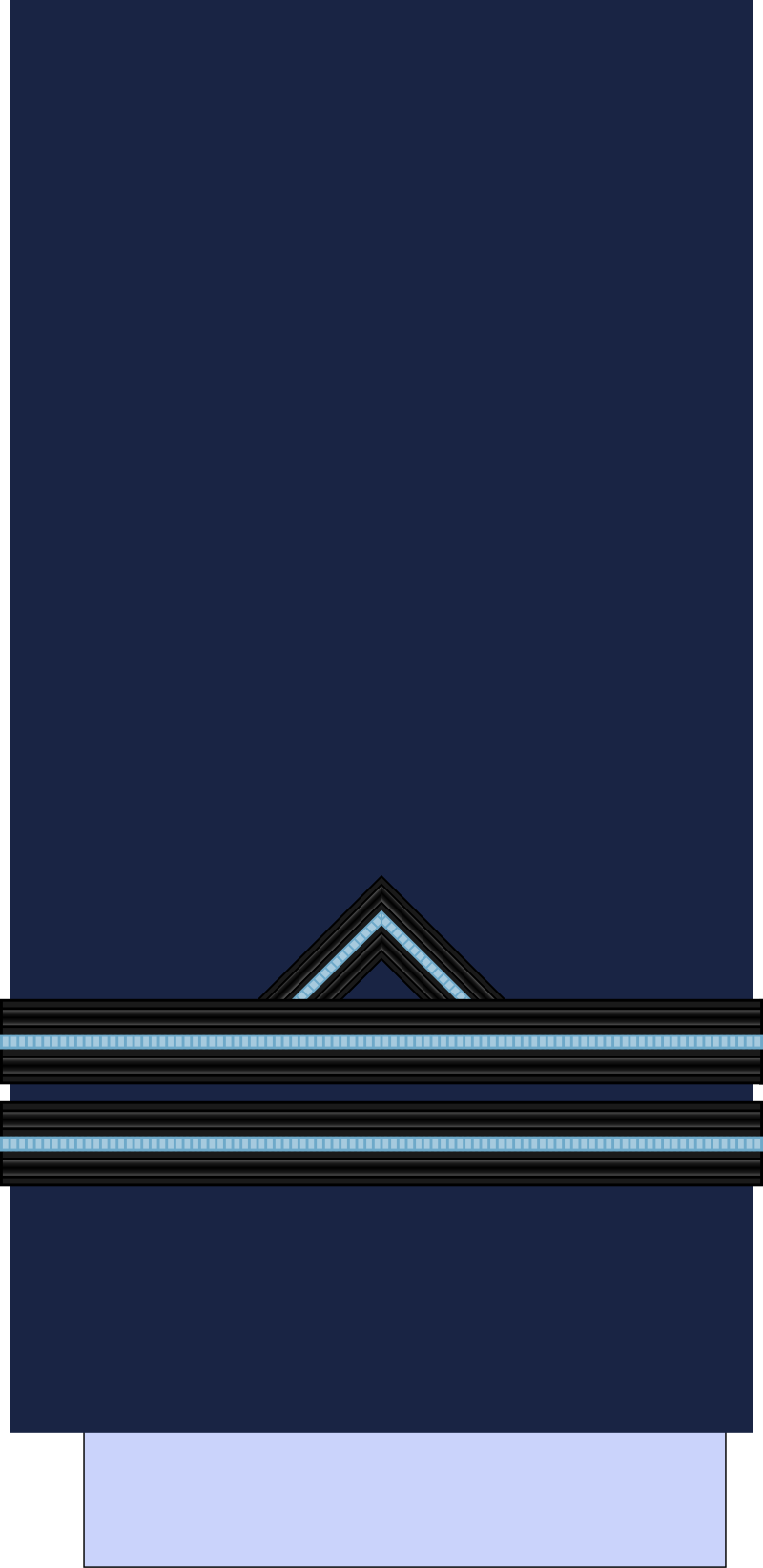
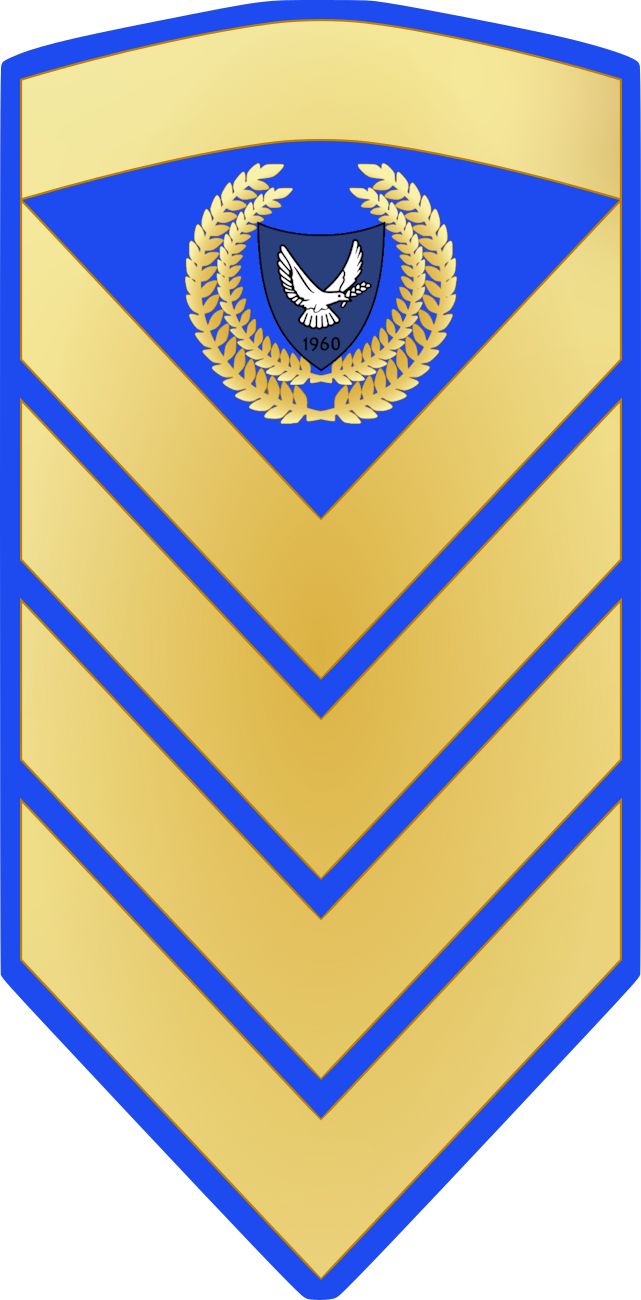
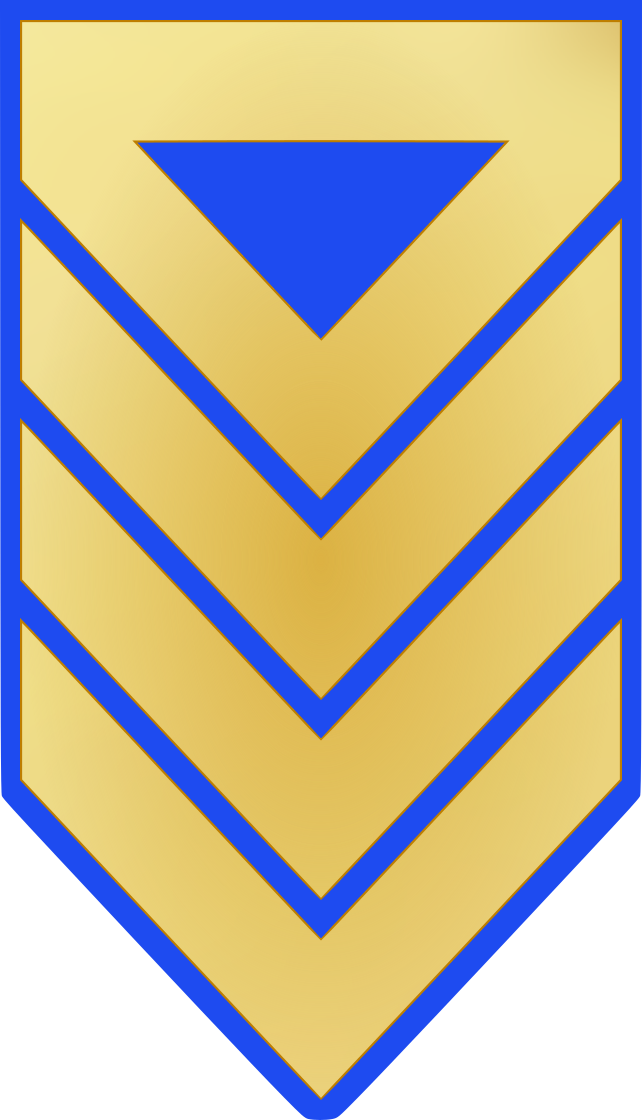
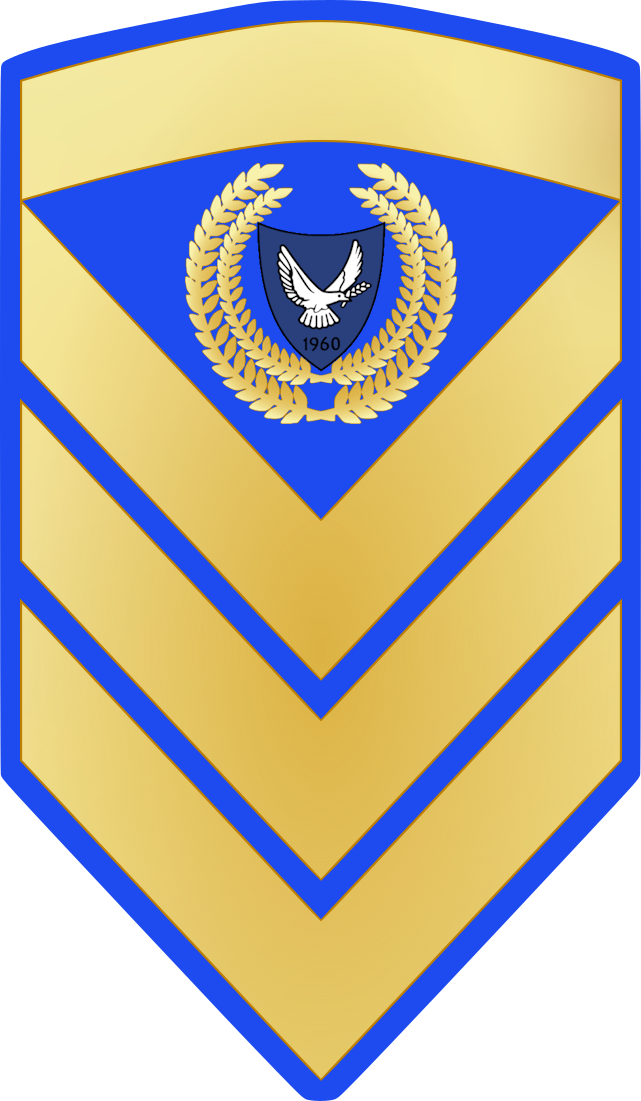
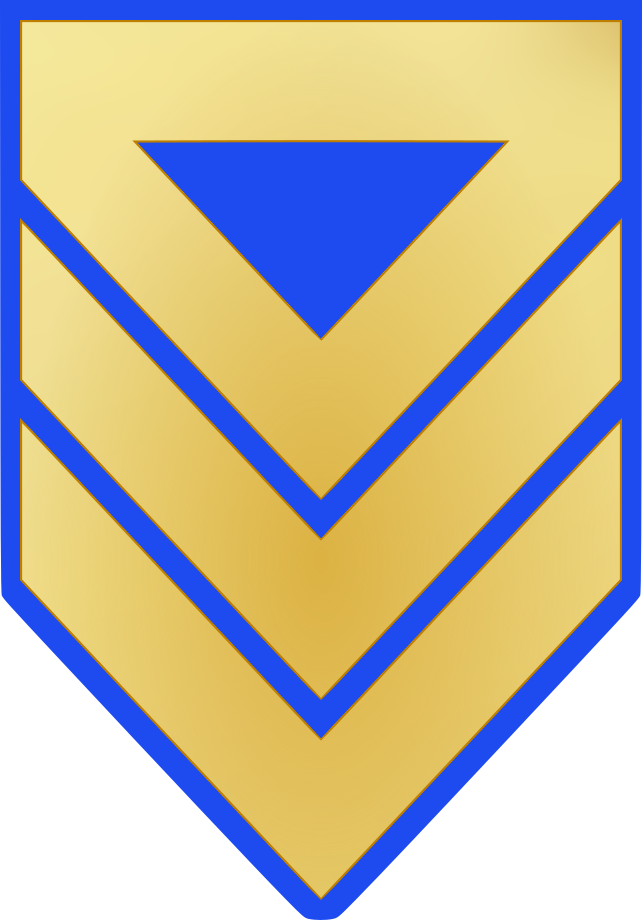
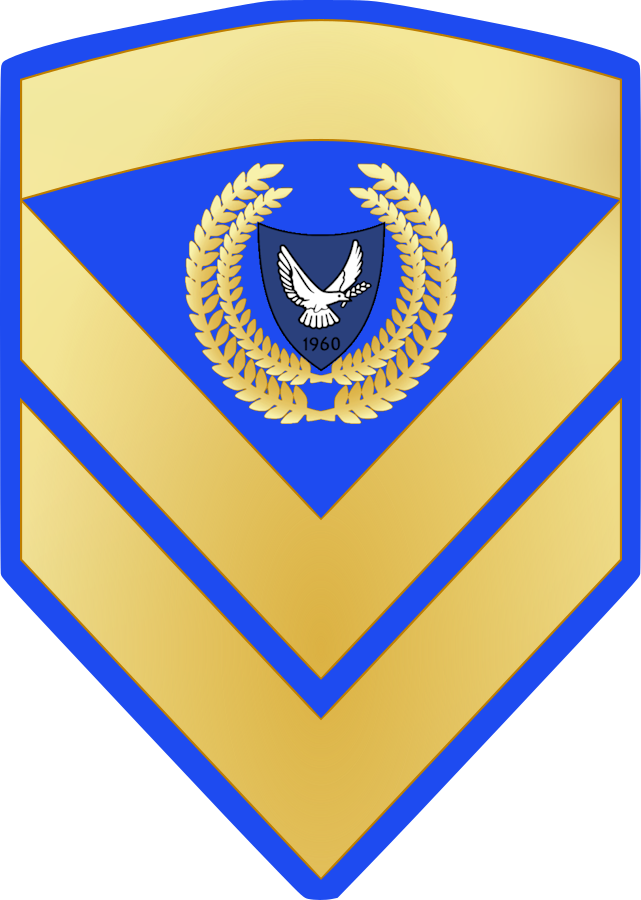
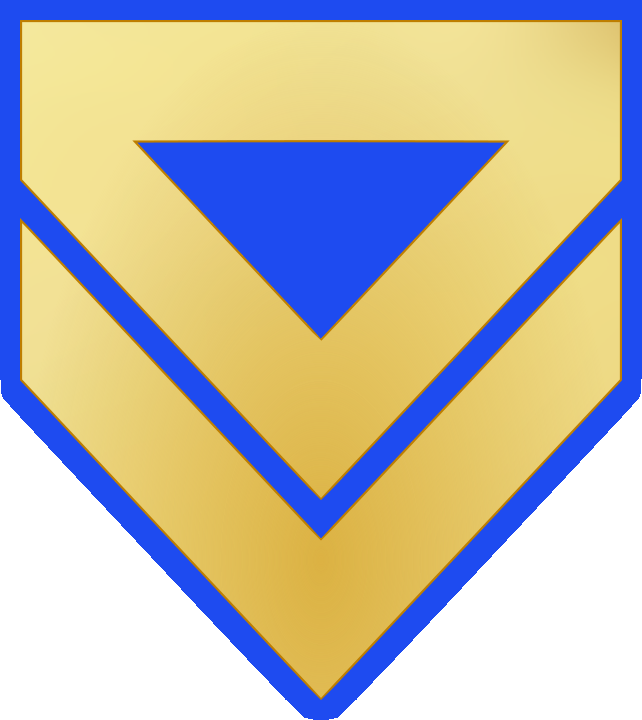
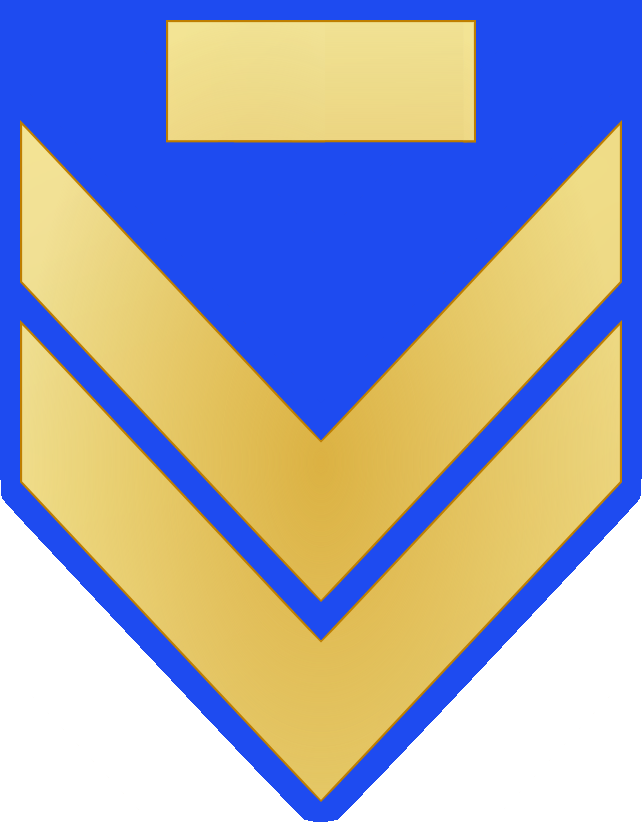
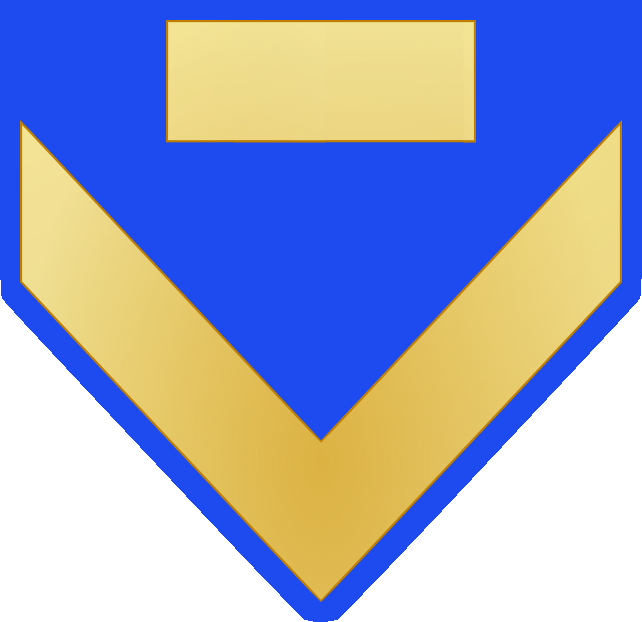
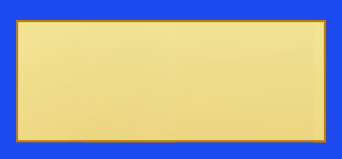
Rank group	Senior NCOs										Junior NCOs		Enlisted
Cyprus Air Forces													Arm/corps insignia only
Cyprus Air Forces	Ανθυπασπιστής Α΄ Anthypaspistís A'	Ανθυπασπιστής Β΄ Anthypaspistís B'	Ανθυπασπιστής Γ΄ Anthypaspistís C'	Αρχισμηνίας; Archisminías	ΣΥΠ Αρχισμηνίας; Syp Archisminías	Επισμηνίας; Episminías	ΣΥΠ Επισμηνίας; Syp Episminías	Σμηνίας; Sminías	ΣΥΠ Σμηνίας; Syp Sminías	ΣΥΟΠ Σμηνίας; Syop Sminías	ΣΥΟΠ Υποσμηνίας; Syop Yposminías	Ανθυποσμηνίας; Anthyposminías	Σμηνίτης; Sminítis

== See also ==
- Armoured vehicles of the Cypriot National Guard
- Cypriot National Guard
- Cyprus Joint Rescue Coordination Center
- List of equipment of the Cypriot National Guard
- List of Cyprus military bases

== Sources ==
- Cyprus National Guard Official website (Air Force section – in Greek)
- Cyprus Air Force
- Cyprus National Guard, Air Force Command
- Tom Cooper "Cyprus, 1955–1973", ACIG Journal
- Tom Cooper & Nicholas Tselepidis "Cyprus 1974", ACIG Journal
- Dirk Jan de Ridder "Cypriot Gunships", Ridder.aero
- Air Defence of Cyprus (in Greek)
