= Aerostar Airlines =

Ukrainian charter operator

Aerostar
IATA	ICAO	Call sign
–	UAR	AEROSTAR
- Founded: 1997
- Hubs: Kyiv International Airport
- Fleet size: 9
- Headquarters: Kyiv, Ukraine
- Website: aerostar.com.ua

Aerostar Airlines was a business jet charter service based in Kyiv, Ukraine. Flight operations started in 1997.

In 2023, the company was listed as having no employees, and its VAT registration was annulled in August 2026.

== Fleet ==
- 1 Beechcraft King Air 350
- 1 Cessna Citation Mustang
- 1 Cessna Citation XLS
- 1 Dassault Falcon 20
- 1 Dassault Falcon 2000
- 1 Dassault Falcon 900

=== Fleet history ===
All the aircraft ever operated by Aerostar Airlines:

Aircraft	Total	Introduced	Retired	Notes
Fairchild Dornier 328JET	3	2007	2019	
