= Cypriot S-300 crisis =

Political standoff between Cyprus and Turkey

The Cypriot S-300 crisis was a tense and rapidly escalating political standoff between the Republic of Cyprus and the Republic of Turkey between early 1997 and late 1998. The confrontation was sparked by Cypriot plans to install two Russian-made S-300 air-defence missile sites on their territory, provoking Turkey into threatening an attack or even all-out war if the missiles were not returned to Russia. The missile deal with Russia represented the Cyprus government's first serious attempt at building a credible air defence system after years of Turkish superiority in the air. The crisis effectively ended in December 1998 with the decision of the Cypriot government to transfer the S-300s to Greece's Hellenic Air Force in exchange for alternative weapons from Greece. The crisis also led to the collapse of Cyprus's coalition government. Greece's Hellenic Air Force installed the system on the island of Crete and as of 2000 the S-300s still operate there.

== Background ==
The S-300 system was completed in 1978. It is designed to defend against short and medium-range air attacks. At its time it was considered one of the world's most powerful air defence systems. Russia sold the S-300 system to 20 countries.

The Imia crisis in the Aegean Sea broke out in the final days of 1995 and reached its peak in January 1996. Failing to stop Turkish Air Force flights Greece concluded that the proportional U.S. arms sales made to both countries could not meet Greek needs. The first step took in this regard in 1996 was to sign a deal with Russia for the purchase of S-300 air defence system for deployment on Cyprus.

As of 1995, the Cypriot government had reportedly begun conceptualisation and planning of an integrated air-defence solution to defend the airspace of the Republic of Cyprus, which, according to local press reports, sustained nearly-daily airspace violations by the Turkish Air Force, acting on behalf of the de facto Turkish state in the north. Further heightening concerns was the recent sale of Israeli ATACMS long-range artillery rockets to Turkey; these weapons could be fired directly from bases on Turkey's southern coast with the capability of reaching Southern Cyprus. The Greek Cypriots determined that they had no ready means of defence against them.

On 3 January 1997, an unnamed defence source leaked information to the Cypriot media regarding the purchase of Russian-made surface-to-air missiles, a story picked up by Reuters, the Cyprus News Agency, and others. The leak reported that the date for the conclusion of the sale between Russia and Cyprus for surface-to-air missile systems would be 4 January 1997.

On 5 January 1997, the Foreign Minister of Cyprus, Alekos Michaelides, announced to the world media that the government had acquired an air-defence capability in the form of Russian-made S-300 air-defence missiles and associated radars. At the stage, details were kept vague, and the media seized upon rumours ranging from claimed numbers of missiles and capability, to wildly-differing claims of the price for the purchase.

On the same day, a government spokesman, Yiannakis Cassoulides, made a statement in which he remarked that the Cyprus government had the legitimate right to enhance its "defence capabilities" and also said that the weapons purchase was "proportional" to the Turkish military buildup in the north of the island. Concurrently, Turkish Defence Minister Turhan Tayan was reported in Turkey as saying that the action would "undermine peace in the region".

Russia's main defence export agency, Rosvooruzheniye, also added its comment to the media frenzy when its spokesman Valery Pogrebenkov stated that the sale of S-300 missiles to Cyprus would not adversely affect the balance of power in the region, as the weapons were "purely defensive".

== Cypriot S-300 missile capability ==
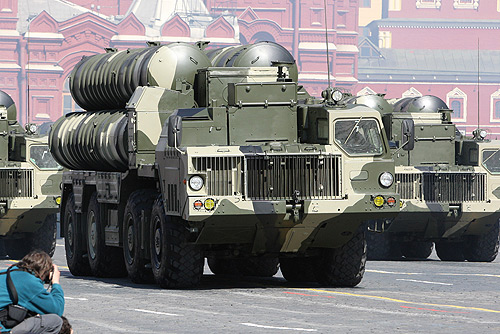
S-300 systems similar to those sold to Cyprus

Although never publicly revealed in exact detail and widely debated, many observers have concurred that the Cypriot government acquired two systems of S-300PMU-1s, each consisting of at least one 64N6E (BIG BIRD D) early-warning and battle management radar and a minimum of 16 5P85TE towed quadruple launchers and 75 48N6 missiles. The missiles would have had a maximum range of 150 km. Other equipment likely to have been provisioned in the purchase, based upon standard deployment practice for this type of weapon array, would have included the 83M6E command and control system, as well as support radar infrastructure and mobile engineer support vehicles.

The primary evidence for such a combat capability has come from gradual disclosure to the media of S-300PMU-1 capabilities in Crete after the 1998 deployment of the weapons to the Greek island. Also, digital aerial and satellite photography, such as that presented by Google Earth, has allowed independent observers to suggest that at least three new military facilities were purpose-built in Cyprus for the deployment of the S-300s (two sites for the missile batteries and one mountain site for the 64N6E radar package). According to some of these observers, the radar site and one of the missile sites were installed in heavily fortified positions on the northern face of Mount Olympus, the largest mountain in the Troodos Mountains. Additionally, a second fortified missile site is claimed to exist near Droushia, a coastal village in the extreme west of the island.

== Turkish reaction ==
On 11 January 1997, Cypriot and US media sources reported that Turkey had overtly threatened either a pre-emptive strike to prevent the arrival of the missiles or an actual war in Cyprus as a response to the arrival of the missiles. Also, it threatened a blockade of Cyprus from Turkey.

Turkey also said that it might occupy an abandoned tourist resort in Cyprus if the Cypriot government did not back down. Turkish Cypriot leader Rauf Denktaş, threatened to take over Varosha, a disputed area that has been sealed off since Turkey's 1974 invasion of Cyprus. Most property in Varosha is owned by Greek Cypriots.

The Turkish Armed Forces, when the purchase of S-300 was announced, obtained surface-to-surface missiles from Israel, which could be used in a military operation to destroy the S-300 if they were installed on the island. Also, according to Turkish media and other countries' intelligence agencies, Turkish pilots with their F-16s were sent to Israel's Negev region to be trained on how to destroy the S-300s. According to Israeli radio reports, Turkish pilots were trained only on how to evade the S-300s, not on how to destroy them. The Israel embassy at Athens denied all reports.

In November 1997, Turkish armed forces carried out a military exercise in Northern Cyprus, where they destroyed S-300 dummy missiles to prepare for operations against the real missiles on Cyprus.

== Cypriot, Greek and Russian counterreactions ==
The Cypriot government protested against the Turkish threats at the United Nations and asserted its right for self-defence and the need for effective deterrence. In addition, Cyprus President Glafcos Clerides said that the missiles would be deployed on the island but used only defensively. Also, the Cypriot National Guard were placed on their highest state of alert and mobilisation since the 1974 invasion of the island by Turkey.

Between January and June 1997, Greece reportedly increased the readiness of the Hellenic Air Force and the Hellenic Navy assets positioned closest to Cyprus and moved to support the Cypriot position tacitly that the missiles were designed only for defence. The situation was then escalated, this time by the Greek decision to send a small contingent of F-16 fighter jets to Cyprus as well as additional troops to reinforce the Greek ELDYK contingent on the island.

Russia initially avoided direct confrontation with Turkey but insisted repeatedly that the sale of S-300s to Cyprus would proceed without interference. Turkey consequently looked to its strategic NATO partners, including the United States for reassurances that it would not be prevented from acting against the perceived threat if the need arose.

== Western reactions ==
Turkish threats led to a campaign by Western countries to prevent the system's deployment on Cyprus for fear of triggering a war in Cyprus that could draw in the Greeks. In addition, the European Union warned that a military buildup could harm Cyprus's application for membership.

The United States strongly opposed Cyprus's plans to install the anti-aircraft weapons; however, it also warned Turkey not to attack. The U.S. State Department spokesman stated: "This is no time for the Turkish government to be making wild and dramatic statements, it would be completely out of bounds for Turkey to take this action."

== Further escalation ==
In the months leading up to June 1997, the two sides traded political rhetoric and aggressive propaganda as both attempted to justify their positions before the international community.

In September 1997, the Turkish Navy and the Turkish Coast Guard began to board and search vessels heading to Cyprus, including Russian-flagged vessels in international waters. The situation alarmed not only the Greek Cypriots but also Athens and Moscow, as was evidenced by official statements in October 1997 indicating that Greece and Russia would engage in war with Turkey if Cyprus was attacked or blockaded.

By December, reports began to surface in Greek and Cypriot media forums that Russia was in the process of mobilising a large naval force with an aircraft carrier with long-range warplanes, a guided-missile cruiser and attack submarines. The presumption was that the force would have two purposes: to transport S-300 missiles and other military articles via Greek waters to Cyprus, and to attack the Turkish Navy if it tried to intervene.

== Defusion ==
Cyprus raised the possibility of cancelling the missile deployment in exchange for a flight moratorium over Cyprus, but Turkey rejected the idea.

Rather than face the political prospect of humiliation by conceding to Turkish demands for the sale to be cancelled outright, Clerides finally decided in December 1998 that the S-300 missile systems would be sent to Crete. Ostensibly, the decision was made to ensure that the deal with Russia would proceed to the latter's economic benefit and that Greece would be compensated for the situation by receiving the defensive capability of the S-300s for Crete. The Turkish government decried the move as a "cynical attempt" to redirect the S-300 missile capability against its southwestern shores and airspace and to give much-desired air defence for Greek ships and aircraft heading from Crete to Cyprus.

The crisis also led to the collapse of the ruling coalition government in Cyprus.

== Cypriot agreement with Greece ==
The Cypriot government never again seriously entertained the return of the S-300 air-defence missile systems to Cyprus for fear of unnecessarily damaging its reputation and position in European political circles. Consequently, in 2007, the missiles were finally and irrevocably sold to Greece in exchange for alternative military articles, reputed to consist of a significant quantity of short-range TOR-M1 missile systems and an undisclosed type of medium-range air-defence missile systems. Greece also supplied Cyprus with twelve self-propelled 155 mm artillery howitzers as partial rental payment for the use of the S-300s between 1999 and 2006.

== Missile testing ==
On 13 December 2013, for the first time since the missile system was acquired, it was tested in Crete.

According to reports, which were not confirmed by either Greece or Israel, Greece activated the S-300 during some drills held between the two countries for Israel's warplanes to practise, test and learn the system's abilities. But a Greek official anonymously said that Greece does not permit any other country to test the system.
