= KMC =

Kmc and KMC may refer to:

== Places ==
India

- Kadapa Municipal Corporation, Kadapa, Andhra Pradesh, India
- Kolkata Municipal Corporation, Kolkata, West Bengal, India
- Kollam Municipal Corporation, Kollam, Kerala, India

Others

- Karachi Metropolitan Corporation, Karachi, Sindh, Pakistan
- Kaiserslautern Military Community, American military community in Germany
- Kandy Municipal Council, the local council for Kandy, Sri Lanka
- Keelung City Council, Keelung City, Taiwan
- Kilauea Military Camp, Hawaii, U.S.

== Business ==
- Kaisis Motor Company
- Kia Motors Company or Kia, South Korean automobile manufacturer
- Kiira Motors Corporation, Ugandan state-owned automotive company
- Kinetic Monte Carlo
- KMC Chain Industrial, company producing bicycle chains
- KMC Controls (originally Kreuter Manufacturing Company), a BAS/HVAC controls manufacturer

== Educational institutes ==
India

- Kakatiya Medical College, Warangal, Telangana
- Kasturba Medical College, Mangalore, Karnataka
- Kasturba Medical College, Manipal, Karnataka
- Kasturba Medical College International Center, Manipal, Karnataka
- KMC Medical College & Hospital, Maharajganj
- Katihar Medical College, Katihar, India
- Katuri Medical College, Guntur, Andhra Pradesh
- Kirori Mal College, University of Delhi
- Kilpauk Medical College, Chennai, Tamil Nadu

Others

- Kapaun Mt. Carmel Catholic High School, Wichita, Kansas, U.S.
- Khulna Medical College, Khulna, Bangladesh
- Khyber Medical College, Peshawar, Pakistan
- Kingston Maurward College, Dorchester, England

== Others ==
- Kangaroo Mother Care, technique of newborn care
- Ken Marlon Charles a.k.a. KMC (musician), a soca musician from Trinidad and Tobago
- An act by Benny Benassi, an Italian DJ
- Kureha Micro Capsule Oil, diisopropylnaphthalene isomers used in inks
- Kuominchun, or in pinyin Guominjun, the military faction founded by Feng Yuxiang, Hu Jingyi and Sun Yue during China's Warlord Era
- Republic of Korea Marine Corps
