= Armoured vehicles of the Cypriot National Guard =

Cypriot Armored Forces
- 20th Armoured Brigade Emblem
- Country: Cyprus
- Branch: Army
- Part of: Cypriot National Guard
- Engagements: Battle of Tylliria (Cyprus 1964), Turkish invasion of Cyprus

The Cypriot National Guard employs several armoured vehicles in its operations.

== History of Cypriot armored warfare ==
=== 1964–74 ===
In August 1964, the Cypriot National Guard, under the leadership of Brig. General Georgios Grivas, engaged an armed Turkish Cypriot militia in heavy fighting at the Battle of Tylliria. During this time, the Cypriot National Guard possessed around 40 ex-Hellenic Army Marmon Herrington Mk-IVF armoured vehicles, which were distributed primarily across the north of the island, in positions facing the massive fortified Turkish enclaves at Kokkina (a coastal beachhead in Morphou district) and especially Saint Hilarion (a complex of Turkish Cypriot mountain and highland positions in Kyrenia district). At the time, the Cypriot National Guard also possessed four Daimler Dingo armoured scout cars (first sighted on 1 October 1964 Independence Day parade in Nicosia) which were formerly of the British Army and had been supplied in 1960 for policing duties, along with an estimated 3 Shorland armoured cars and a number of C-17 armoured utility trucks.

On 8–9 August 1964, a sustained Turkish air-attack in the Tylliria area resulted in the destruction of a Marmon Herrington Mk-IVF armoured car, which caught fire after a bomb fell on a nearby building in Kato Pyrgos on 9 August. On the same day, a Greek Cypriot Daimler Dingo was fired upon by a Turkish Cypriot machine gun position at Ortakioi, resulting in a sustained gun battle.

The running battles between the Cypriot National Guard (and smaller armed factions such as EOKA) with the Turkish Cypriots illuminated major deficiencies in the Greek Cypriot ability to apply armoured assets effectively in the battlefield, since the only available vehicles were lightly armed, and lacked heavy armour or firepower. Thus, in September 1964, the Republic of Cyprus secured a major arms deal with the Soviet Union for the delivery of 35 T-34/85 medium tanks and 45 BTR-152 armoured personnel carriers, the former to equip a medium tank battalion (the 23 ΕΜΑ) and the latter to equip a mechanised infantry battalion (the 286 MTP).

Until the arrival of these vehicles in late 1965, the Greek Cypriots were forced to overcome the limitations of their National Guard by supplementing their armoured forces with home-made armoured vehicles, produced both by the National Guard Technical Corps and civilian contracts. This led to the creation of a small national arms industry, centred around a handful of civilian companies, which largely prevailed until the 1974 invasion. The loss of several important warehouses and factories (especially those of the Kaisis Motor Company) near Nicosia International Airport in the 1974 invasion, combined with the effective destruction of the island's economy, effectively ended the Cypriot arms industry, and it never returned to prominence.

=== 1974 invasion of Cyprus by Turkey ===
On 20 July 1974, Turkey initiated a surprise invasion of the island of Cyprus without issuing a declaration of war, on the pretext of intervening against a military coup taking place in the Capital of Nicosia.

At the outset, the first Greek Cypriot unit (the 251 Infantry battalion) to reach the Turkish beachhead at Pentemilli (Five Mile Beach) was equipped with five T-34/85 tanks seconded from the 23 ΕΜΑ. These tanks pressed aggressively into the beachhead zone and destroyed two Turkish recoilless rifle positions and two Turkish M-113 APCs, before four vehicles succumbed to anti-tank weapons and air attack. The fifth tank withdrew and was abandoned at the camp of the 251 Battalion with mechanical problems.

On the same day, the 23 ΕΜΑ medium tank battalion was instructed to support Greek and Greek Cypriot forces in an attack on the Turkish-controlled enclave of Geunyeli, just north-west of Nicosia, which was being used to blockade the Nicosia-Kyrenia highway and prevent Greek Cypriot reinforcements from reaching Kyrenia, which was under attack. Fearing that the Turks might also use Geunyeli to form a bridgehead between Kyrenia and Nicosia, some 19 T-34/85 tanks were deployed in the action in a concerted effort with infantry and artillery to destroy Turkish resistance there.

Upon reaching the Turkish defensive line at Geunyeli, the Greek Cypriot and Greek coalition formation encountered fortifications and a line of anti-tank obstacles that could not be circumnavigated. Two tanks attempted to press through and became trapped, and had to be abandoned under heavy fire. A further two T-34s were destroyed by Turkish war planes, which were now subjecting the area to bombardment. Facing a disaster, the Greek Cypriots recalled their fifteen remaining T-34s to a safe distance in order to provide supporting fire. However, continuing air attacks and smoke cover caused confusion and disarray, and the Greek Cypriot and Greek forces withdrew rather than press into the enclave without support.

== Main Cypriot armored vehicles of 1960 - 1974 ==
This section includes vehicles that entered service during the period of 1960 - 1974.

=== T-34/85 main battle tank ===
The Greek Cypriots operated a total of 32-35 Russian-made T-34 tanks that were acquired from Soviet Union and delivered via Egypt in 1964–65 on board Cypriot merchant ship "Constantis Boushes" (Kωνσταντής Mπουσές). These tanks were supplied to the 23ΕΜΑ Medium Tank Battalion, with the main base at Kokkinotrimithia, Kyrenia (this base was vacant at the time of the Turkish invasion, since tanks were needed in Nicosia for the 15 July coup). The T-34 variant in service was the later-model T-34/85, equipped with a WW2-era 85mm gun.

The vehicles were operated in a dark green camouflage, probably used by the original Warsaw Pact user, and retained this camouflage afterwards, though during combat, there is evidence that the tanks were streaked with paint or mud to break up the colour. Cypriot National Guard T-34s were entirely unique from all Soviet and Warsaw Pact countries in that they mounted the US M2 Browning .50-cal machine gun, originally on the rear of the turret roof, on top of the ventilator domes. Some time before 1974, the armament was then moved forward to the front of the turret, in front of the commanders cupola. The standard identifying marking was a dark blue square overlaid with a white cross, identical to that used by the Hellenic Army, and intended to show the obvious affinity of the indigenous population majority towards Hellenism, and to some extent, unionism with Greece. All of the tanks carried a number plate painted onto the front glacis plate. Following the 1974 invasion by Turkey, numbers in service were drastically reduced through attrition, and the last remaining operational examples were painted in sand yellow and green camouflage, with a yellow bridging class disk applied centrally to their lower bow plate.

Typical features of the Cypriot T-34/85 included a lack of uniformity, suggesting different factory and date sources of manufacture, with varied sub-types of turret for the 85mm gun, and a tendency to employ different types of wheels, often on the same vehicle. The most commonly used wheel type was the 5-spoked "starfish" shaped type, though it is common to see multi-spoke fan-shaped and solid-disc shaped wheel.

In 1985, the remaining handful of T-34s were withdrawn from service.

=== BTR-152V1 APC ===
Around 40 BTR-152V1 armored personnel carriers were acquired for the Cypriot National Guard from the Soviet Union in 1964-65 during the early presidency of Archbishop Makarios. During the period of the 1974 war, all of the BTR-152 armored personnel carriers are believed to have served with the 286MTP (Tagmatos Pezikou / Battalion Infantry Mechanised).

The National Guard only used the V1 production model of the BTR-152, of a variant with a frontal winch emplacement and no roof, and mounting a version of the Goryunov 7.62mm coaxial machine gun with steel plate protection. Camouflage appears to have been olive green or similar shade, and would probably have been coated with mud during combat conditions to break up the colour, as was the tendency with Cypriot armored vehicles. Vehicles captured by the Turkish Army were painted white for display purposes. A Hellenic Army blue-white cross insignia was typically carried on either front door of the vehicle, and by 1965, all vehicles operated with the standard "EF-1234" registration, EF denoting Ethniki Froura, or National Guard.

=== Marmon Herrington Mk-IVF AFV ===
An estimated 40 of these armored cars served in the 21 EAN (21st Armored Reconnaissance Battalion), which are known to have been in service in 1964. The vehicles were either supplied from Britain or Greece as surplus. The Marmon Herrington Mk-IVF's in service with the National Guard during 1974 were likely to be some of the very last of their type to see main deployment in battle, anywhere in the world (a situation similar to the Daimler Dingo's and M8 Greyhounds) - evidence of a modern war fought with vintage weapons by a Commonwealth country, where virtually the entire inventory is made up of surplus materials from other countries.

Although the vehicle was typically intended for a 3-man crew, it is not uncommon to encounter photographs suggesting a four-man crew in Cypriot service.

During the war of July–August 1974, and the coup preceding it, Marmon-Herrington Mk-IVF armored vehicles were photographed with two-tone camouflage (dark olive green and mustard white), probably applied just before combat conditions to break up the colour. It was standard practice in combat conditions to completely cover the vehicle with foliage and / or foliage mesh, and this too is recorded by photography. External stores were either strapped in bags on the side of the hull, or in baskets or holders on the rear quarters of the hull. A spare tyre was typically carried at the rear of the vehicle. During 1964, there are photographic records that the Marmon Herrington's carried a two-digit identification number, painted in white paint on the front right quarter of the chassis, just right of the headlamp on that side, with one recorded number being "39". The vehicles were routinely brought out in immaculate conditions for parades during the 1960s, which were fairly frequent, and may often have been reviewed without identification numbers. In some instances, the carriage baskets at the rear were either removed or painted bright white for parades. All of the vehicles mounted a radio set with high-gain antennae.

The vehicle was not particularly well armored by 1970s combat standards, achieving up to 20mm and moderate sloping of the front and side plating. Survivability would have been largely down to a potential road speed of 80 km/h and the addition of two forward firing smoke mortars, as well as a radio for situational awareness. Armament was a British QF 2-pounder 40mm anti-tank gun, of WW2 era, with a range of anything up to 1,000 yards at a muzzle velocity of 2,650 feet per second, mounted in a two-man turret. Secondary armament was a coaxial Browning 7.62mm machine gun, suggesting a late production 1943 sub-variant.

One of these vehicles with the designation of EF020 is now on display at the National Tank Museum in Bonnington, Dorset, England, and it was transported to the UK in 1986.

=== M47 Patton main battle tank (captured) ===
Two M47 Patton main battle tanks were captured in an intact and operable condition during the Greek Cypriot resistance to the 1974 invasion of the north of the island by Turkey. The first example, 092273, was captured from an armored column belonging to the 5th Armored Brigade on 2 August 1974 at Kornos Hill, in an ambush by the 316th Infantry Battalion of the Cypriot National Guard. The 316th, equipped with M40A1 recoilless rifles, destroyed a leading M47 and a rearguard M113, consequently trapping an M47 and M113 on a narrow dirt track. Example 092273 was handed over to elements of the 286 Mechanised Infantry Battalion on 3 August 1974, and was sent to Nicosia to defend the Capital. The vehicle remained in Greek Cypriot service until 1993, and survives as a war trophy. The second example (serial unknown) was captured by the 231st Infantry Battalion from an armored unit supporting the Turkish 50th Infantry Regiment at the village of Agios Vassilias, Kyrenia district, in an ambush with 106mm anti-tank weapons that destroyed two other M47s on 15 August 1974. The tank was used to shell the enemy, but could not be recovered from the battlefield and was consequently destroyed by its Greek Cypriot crew.

=== M113A1 APC (captured) ===
A single M113 armored personnel carrier of the Turkish 5th Armored Brigade was captured by the 316th Infantry Battalion on 2 August 1974. The vehicle served the 286MTP in Nicosia during 1974, and then went on to serve until its retirement in the early 1990s. It survives as a war trophy.

=== Unknown medium tank (stored) ===
First reported in 1975, it is believed that President Archbishop Makarios III had acquired four medium tanks of unknown type and origin for his personal paramilitary force, the Tactical Police Reserve. These four tanks were stored secretly in a warehouse in an industrial estate adjacent to the Nicosia International Airport, but fell into the hands of the UN where a buffer zone was established in the area in August 1974.

== Improvised Cypriot armored vehicles of 1960 - 1974 ==
This section includes domestically produced vehicles during the period of 1960 - 1974.

=== Armored vehicle (modified Valentine Mk-II) ===
First photographed on parade in Nicosia in May 1964, a single modified Valentine Mk-II served in the Cypriot National Guard. It was restored to active use from a hull, which lacked a turret, which had been used as a towing tractor at a plaster manufacturing site. The work was carried out by Sophocles Potamitis. The Greek Cypriots installed a box-shaped turret of their own on the vehicle, sufficient to allow a gunner to fire a Bren gun from a standing position inside the vehicle. It almost certainly served with a two-man crew. The vehicle still survives and is owned by the Cypriot National Guard, who intend to place it in a proposed new military museum.

=== Armored personnel carrier (converted from AT-S artillery tractor) ===
It is known that during battles near Kyrenia in 1974, 346th infantry battalion of the 3rd Tactical Group were using few improvised APCs, converted from Russian-made artillery tractors AT-S (also known as ATS-712). One of them was destroyed by Turkish AT weapon and later placed on display at Turkish war memorial near Pentemili beach.

=== Armored bulldozer "Demon Type / K-Type" ===
The so-called Demon type (the Greek Cypriot operators apparently marked their own vehicles in paint or chalk with this name) entered service no later than January 1964, with an estimated 5, or possibly six vehicles involved in combat house demolition in the Turkish Cypriot-held Ktima quarter of Paphos in March 1964, as well as in later skirmishes in Nicosia. Similar tactics had been noted in use by the Israelis in Palestinian-controlled territories, leading to a Greek Cypriot use of bulldozers fitted with armour to level buildings favoured by Turkish Cypriots as hide-outs, machine-gun nests and sniper positions.

All vehicles of this type were marked with a "K-1" format serial number, marked in bold white characters on the sides and rear. The vehicle was essentially a tracked medium bulldozer (type unknown) encased inside a rectangular box of approximately 0.5-inch (13 mm) thick steel plate. The driver sat in the conventional position at the rear of the vehicle and viewed the frontal arc through two narrow slats. The vehicle was equipped with a metal roof box, suitable to shield a gunner who would stand behind the seated driver and fire an automatic weapon across the frontal arc of the vehicle, to suppress enemy fire.

=== Armored vehicle (Commer Spacevan?) ===
First photographed in 1964, this vehicle appears to be a Commer Spacevan type truck which has been encased with steel plate, providing sloped armour on all quarters. The vehicle carries no turret, and appears to be only accessible from a roof hatch. A roof-top ventilation port is visible towards the front of the vehicle, along with a Cypriot flag, presumably used to identify the vehicle. No external markings visible. The hull is installed with recessed square-shaped ports (3 on each side, and 2 on the rear), presumably to allow for occupants to fire small arms out of the vehicle. Unknown number produced, service life, designation or manufacturer. Possibly a KMC (Kaisis Motor Company) construction as this company was apparently licensed to produce and sell Commer type vehicles in the 1960s.

=== Armored vehicle (Commer Carrier) ===
First photographed in May 1964 in Nicosia with the designation EF-15, the vehicle was a Commer 3/4-ton truck entirely encased in sloped steel plate armour. Almost certainly served with a two-man crew, the vehicle possessed an unusual arrangement of two small turrets, one behind the other. The front turret appears to have covered the frontal arc of fire for a gunner with a lightweight Sten sub machine gun, whilst the rear turret covered the rear arc of fire. Only one vehicle is known to exist, and the fate is unknown.

A 1964 line-up of three Cypriot armoured vehicles - (front to back) Commer Carrier, Demon type and Valentine.

A 1964 photo of a Cypriot Commer Carrier type armoured vehicle

== Main Cypriot armored vehicles of 1974 - present ==
Current equipment sources prove links with Greece. Some was received from Greek Army stock or purchased in France, a close Greek ally. Besides that opportunity came to buy Russian tanks and IFVs at good prices.

In near future is expected to replace them. Potential sources may be Israel or US. There were rumours surplus Merkava tanks purchase was being negotiated. Cyprus improved relations with US may allow to purchase surplus equipment like M1 tanks or M2 Bradley IFVs. Greece was also interested in buying M2 IFVs plus its good combat performance in Ukraine may lead to them being purchased.

=== T-80U / UK main battle tank ===
27 T-80Us and 14 T-80UKs were ordered in 1996 from Russia. The T-80Us were delivered in 1996 and the T-80UKs were delivered in 1997. In 1999, a planned order for 41 additional T-80U/UK type tanks was cancelled due to political sensitivities.

As of 2009, the Cyprus National Guard is to equip with a further 41 T-80U/UK type tanks from Russian suppliers, with a pre-agreement reportedly made for a further 41 tanks of the type. The deal was previously erroneously reported to consist of Russian T-90 tanks.

=== AMX-30 / AMX-30B2 main battle tank ===
The Initial Batch of 53 Tanks was delivered from France in 1987. Second Batch of 52 Tanks from Greece in 1996 and a Final Batch of 9 in 2003.

=== M48A5 MOLF main battle tank (loaned) ===
These were originally sent to the Greek Army ELDYK forces stationed on the island, forming 2 tank Battalions.

=== BMP-3 armoured infantry fighting vehicle ===
43 delivered in 1995–1996

=== EE-9 Cascavel armored fighting vehicle ===
The Engesa EE-9 Cascavel Armoured Car was purchased in 1980 with deliveries starting in 1981 to 1988, a total of a 126 was received. These were the first modern AFV in service at the time. The Cascavels are the Standard Mark IV/V Versions. It has a top speed of 80 km/h off the Road and 110 km/h on Road . It is armed with a 90 mm Belgian Cockerill Mk 3 gun, improved day and night optics with laser rangefinder, and a 12.7 mm antiaircraft MG.

=== EE-3 Jararaca armored fighting vehicle ===
The Engesa EE-3 Jararaca Armoured Car was purchased in 1982 with deliveries starting in 1984 to 1985, a total of a 36 was received.24 Vehicles are armed with Milan Anti Tank Missile Launchers. The Car has a 3-man crew with a top speed of 100 km/h and is armed with 1 x 20-mm Rh202 autocannon, 1 x 12.7mm machinegun.

=== AMX-VCI armoured personnel carrier ===
27 of these vehicles were order in 1982 this version is armed with a 20mm cannon in a one-man turret.

=== VAB - VCI / VTT / VCAC armoured vehicle ===
In 1982 100 vehicles were ordered. The VTT was armed with a 7.62mm machine gun mounted above the co driver's position. In 1991 an additional eighteen six-wheeled VCAC Hot UTM-800 were delivered armed with four Euromissile launchers on the turret. These vehicles also carried 7.62mm machine gun.

== See also ==
- Cypriot National Guard
- Cyprus Air Forces
- List of equipment of the Cypriot National Guard
- Reported Military Losses during the Invasion of Cyprus (1974)
- Battle of Pentemili beachhead (1974)
