= Clan Crusader =

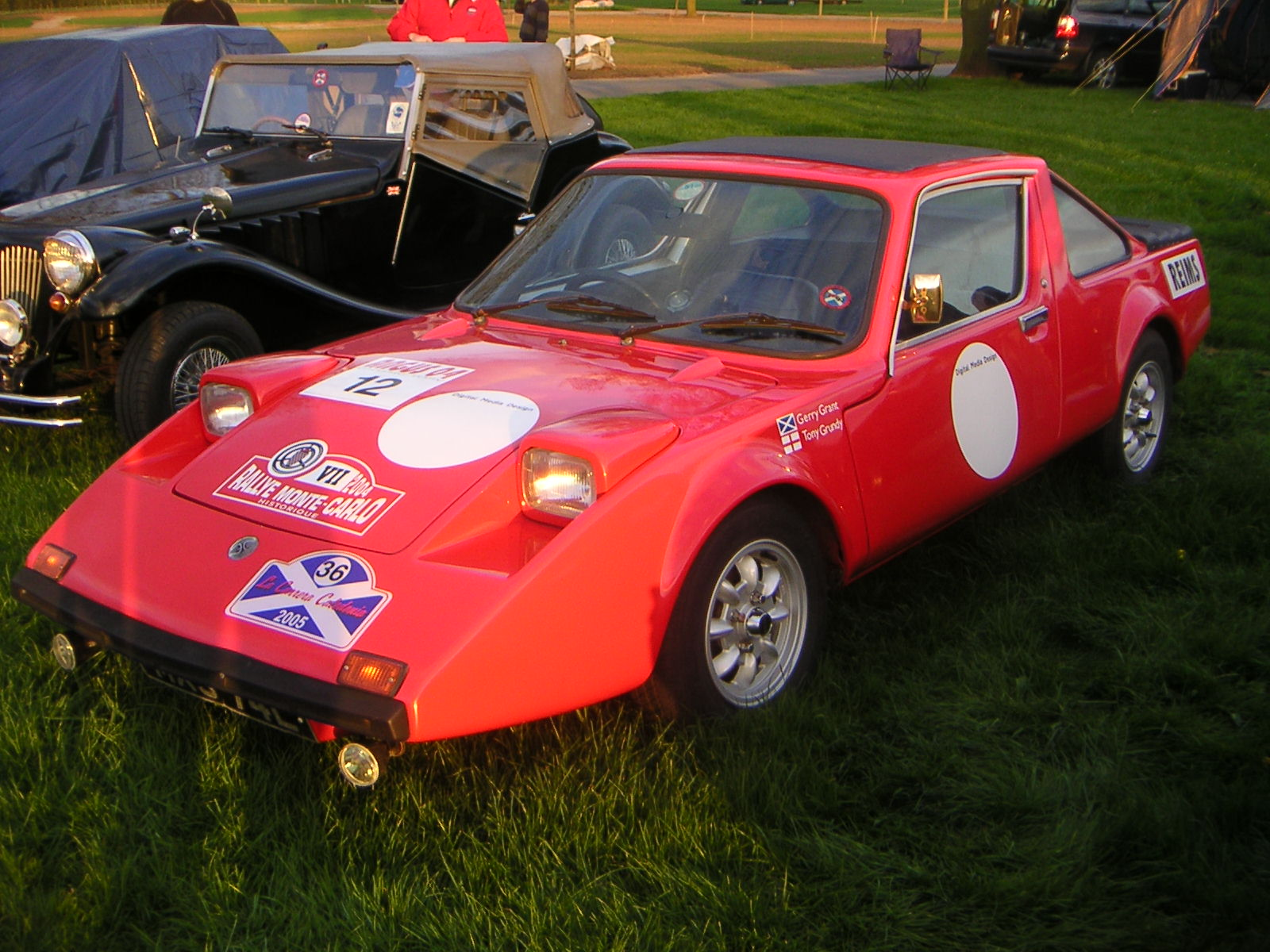

Overview
- Production: 1971–74; 315 produced more produced after tooling was sold

Body and chassis
- Class: Sports car
- Body style: 2-door sports coupé
- Layout: RR layout

Powertrain
- Engine: 875 cc SOHC I4 (Hillman Imp); 998 cc SOHC I4 (Hillman Imp)

Dimensions
- Wheelbase: 82.25 in (2,089 mm)
- Length: 150 in (3,810 mm)
- Width: 59 in (1,499 mm)
- Height: 42.75 in (1,086 mm)
- Curb weight: 615 kg (1,356 lb)

The Clan Crusader is a fibreglass monocoque British sports car based on running gear from the Hillman Imp Sport, including its Coventry Climax inspired, rear-mounted 875 cc engine. It was first made in Washington, Co Durham, England between 1971 and 1974, but since then several efforts have been made to bring the car back to production. Plans were made by Martin Phaff (of previous Ginetta fame) to re-resurrect the Clan in 2009, but nothing seems to have come of the project so far.

== Clan Crusader ==
The car was designed by a group of ex-Lotus engineers led by Paul Haussauer with styling by John Frayling. The company was set up in 1969, and small-scale production began in July 1971. From September, official production began at a new factory in Washington set up with the aid of a government grant. Engineer Brian Luff, one of the brains behind the all-conquering Lotus 72, created "a remarkably strong, yet ultra-lightweight, monocoque." Aside from the engine, front and rear suspensions were also lifted from the donor Imp. Handling was described as both agile and tenacious, and more power would not have proved a problem. Design was distinct rather than pretty, with debatable protruding headlights and slablike sides. The black plastic engine lid opened sideways, to the left.

The car was available in either kit or fully built versions. With the 51 hp (38 kW) at 6,100 rpm Imp Sport engine and four-speed manual transmission, top speed was 99 mph (159 km/h) Although the little car received good reviews and achieved some competition success, it was expensive at £1400 (£1123 in kit form) when compared with rivals. With little financial backing, constant industrial action, the fuel crisis, and the imposition of VAT on kit cars in 1973 meant that Clan soon met its end despite passing MIRA crash testing in 1972. Particularly troublesome was when Chrysler went on strike and deliveries of running gear stalled. The company shut down in November 1973. Total production in this first phase was 315, although a number were later finished from incomplete cars sold by the receivers.

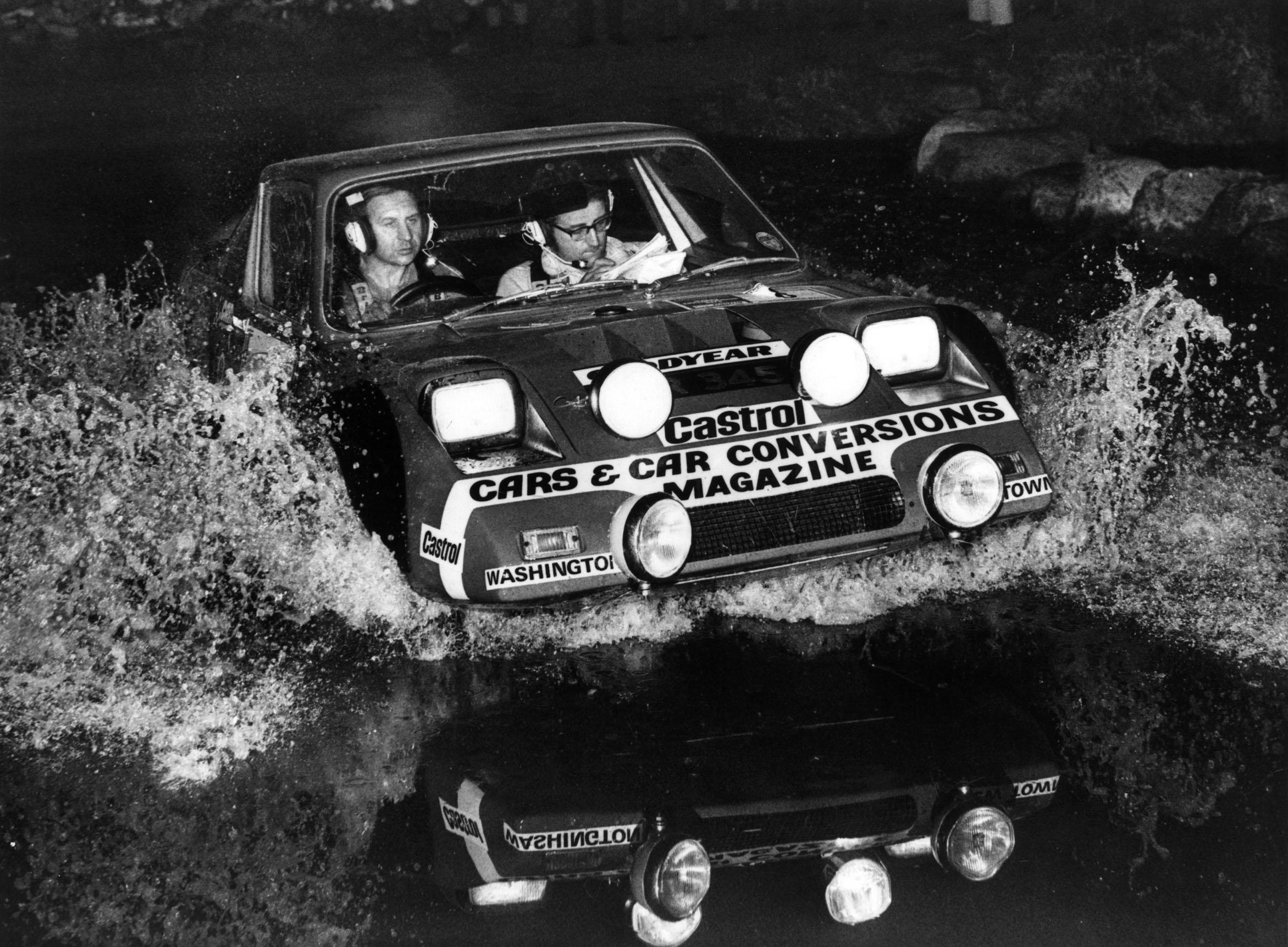
Alan Conley driving a Crusader at the Illuminations Rally, 7th October 1973

After closure the body moulds were bought by Andreas Kaisis, a businessman from Cyprus and owner of the Kaisis Motor Company. Just as production was about to begin, Turkey invaded Cyprus and plans were shelved. These moulds remained under cover until brought back to Britain a few years later. Meanwhile, about a dozen or so replica body shells made by copying an existing car were sold by Brian Luff. In 1982, Clan-fan Peter McCandless bought these moulds and intended to revive the car. At the same time, original founder Haussauer had the same idea and a period of recriminations occurred.

== 'Irish' Clan ==
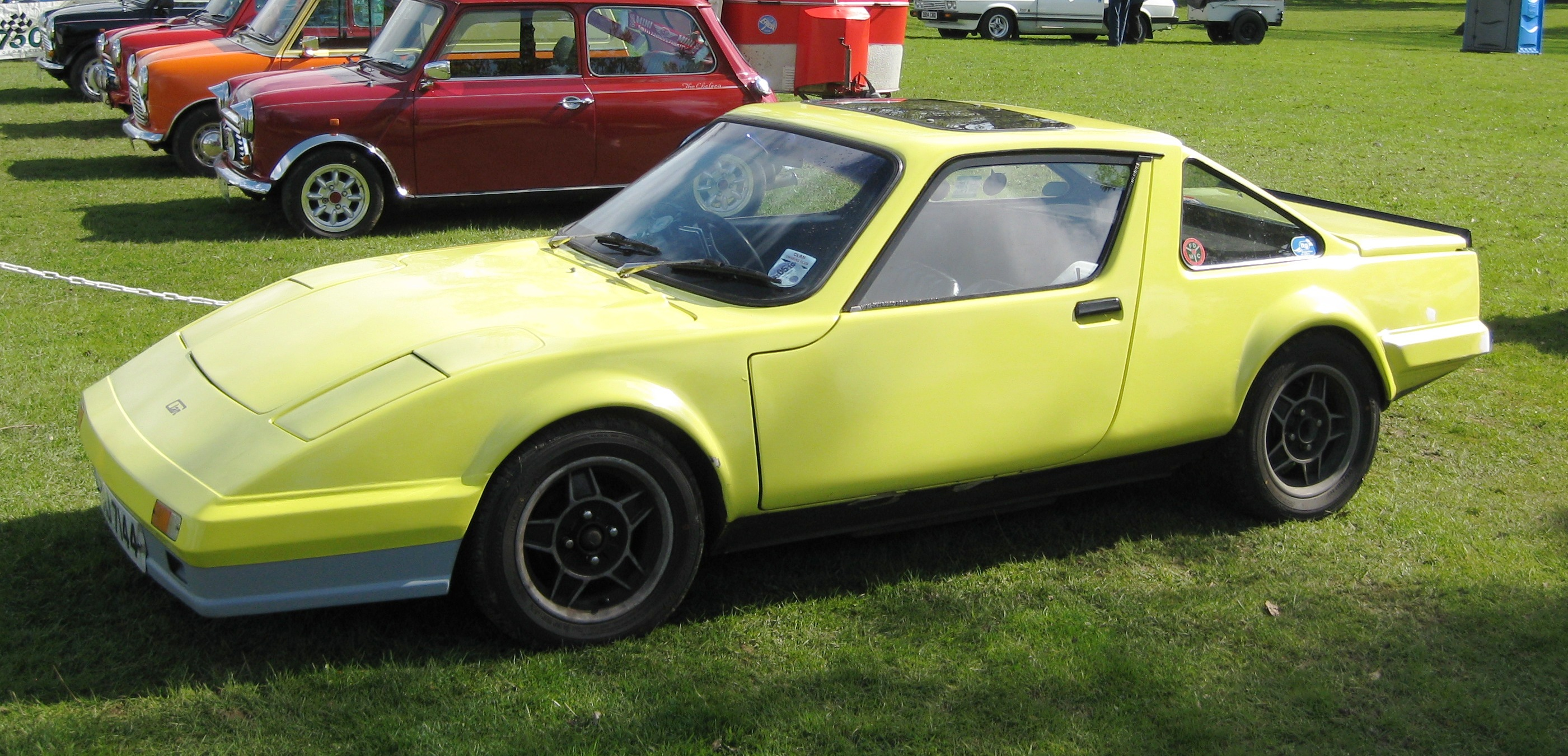
Irish-built Clan, note flip-up headlights

In 1982 some "unofficial" body moulds were bought by Peter McCandless who started a new company called Clan Cars Ltd. in Newtownards, Northern Ireland. McCandless built about 120 road cars and 10 competition cars in Ireland over the next four years. The Crusader name was not used for these cars. Contemporary advertisements give an amazing price range of from £1,200 for a basic kit to £10,000 for a complete road ready car with new engine. The car, with a 998 cc Imp engine, was improved with disc brakes (from the MGB). Other differences were its pop-up lights, heavier bumpers, chin spoiler, 13-inch wheels and a dashboard from the Ford Fiesta. The Clan also had standard front disc brakes and Pirelli P6 tyres.

The car was available in two specifications, Clan E and Clan S. The E has 68 hp (51 kW) while the more powerful S has 78 hp (58 kW), enough for a top speed of about 180 km/h (112 mph). According to Clan themselves, it would only take 30 hours to assemble a kit. After Clan cars closed the body moulds were purchased by members of the Clan Owner's Club to use to make replacement panels.

=== Clan Clover ===
Mid-engined Clan Clover
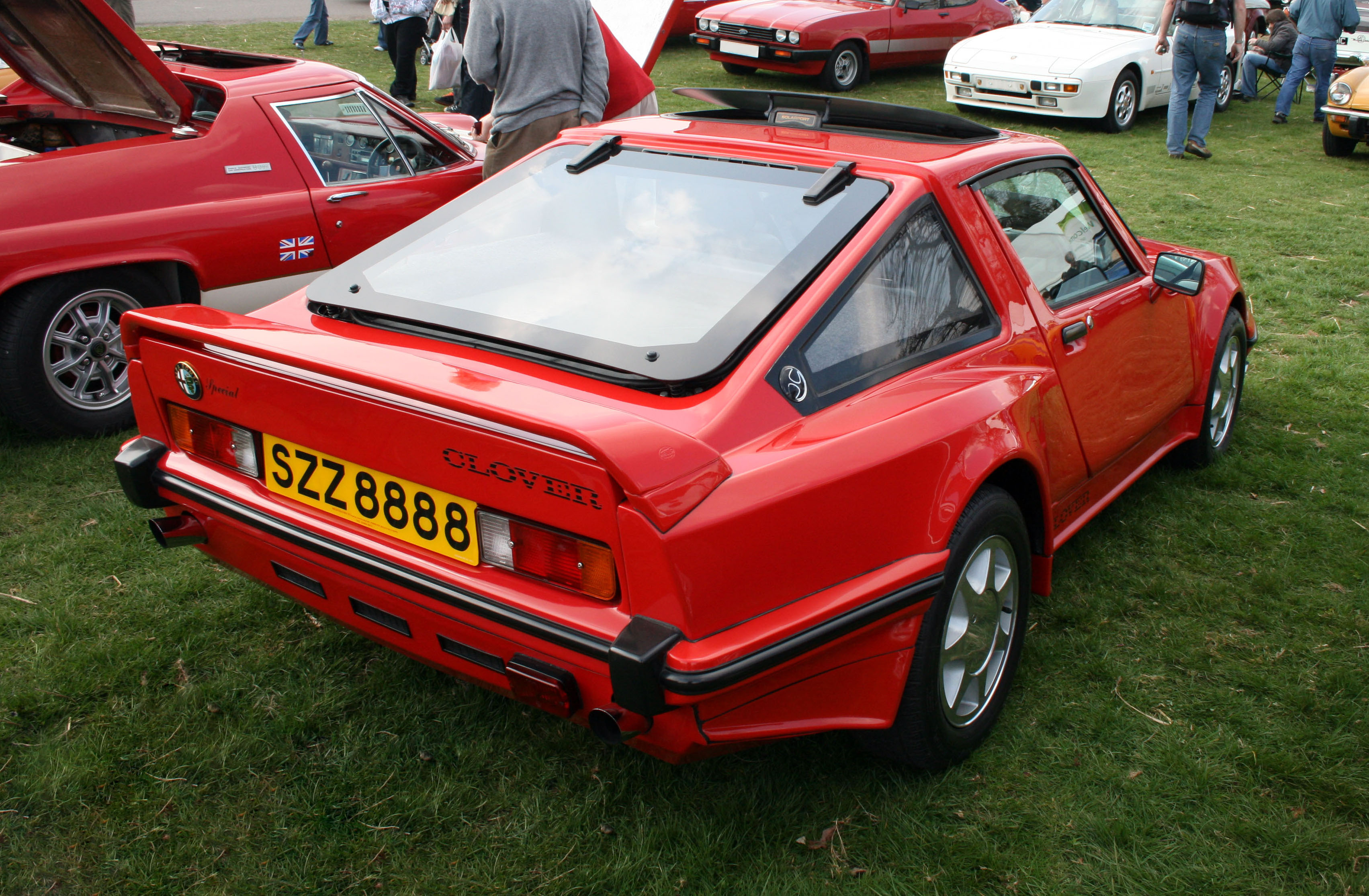
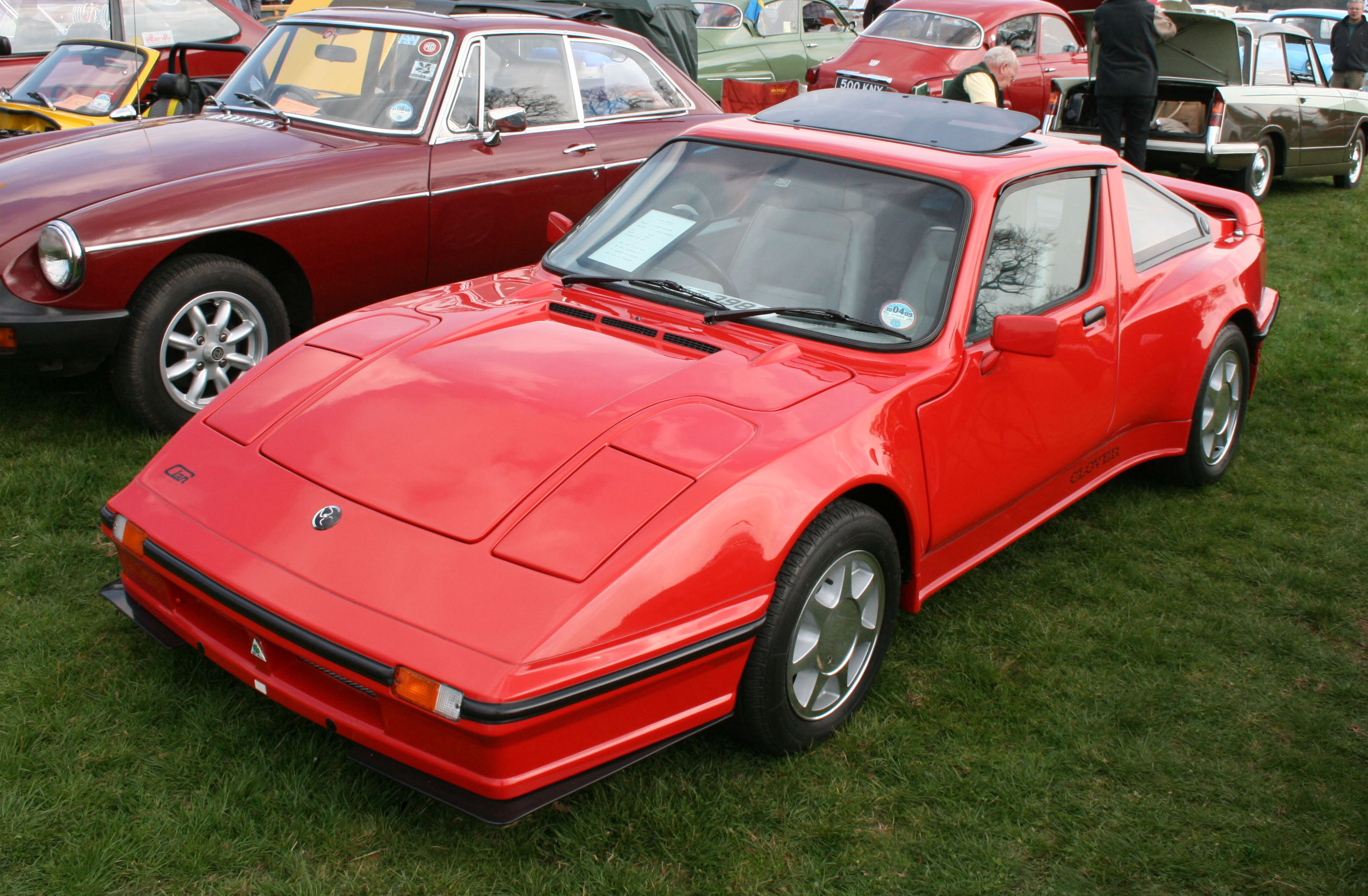

In 1985 Clan Cars developed a new, mid-engined version called the Clan Clover. It used a 1,490 cc, 105 hp (77 kW) Alfa Romeo Boxer engine and gearbox; hence the "clover" name which is a reference to Alfa's Quadrifoglio emblem. It also received new glass, a rear spoiler, and blistered arches. It is believed that approximately 26 cars were made (twenty road cars and six racing versions). After well-publicized quality issues, Clan Cars ran into financial difficulties and went into receivership, ceasing trading in June 1987.

== McCoy ==
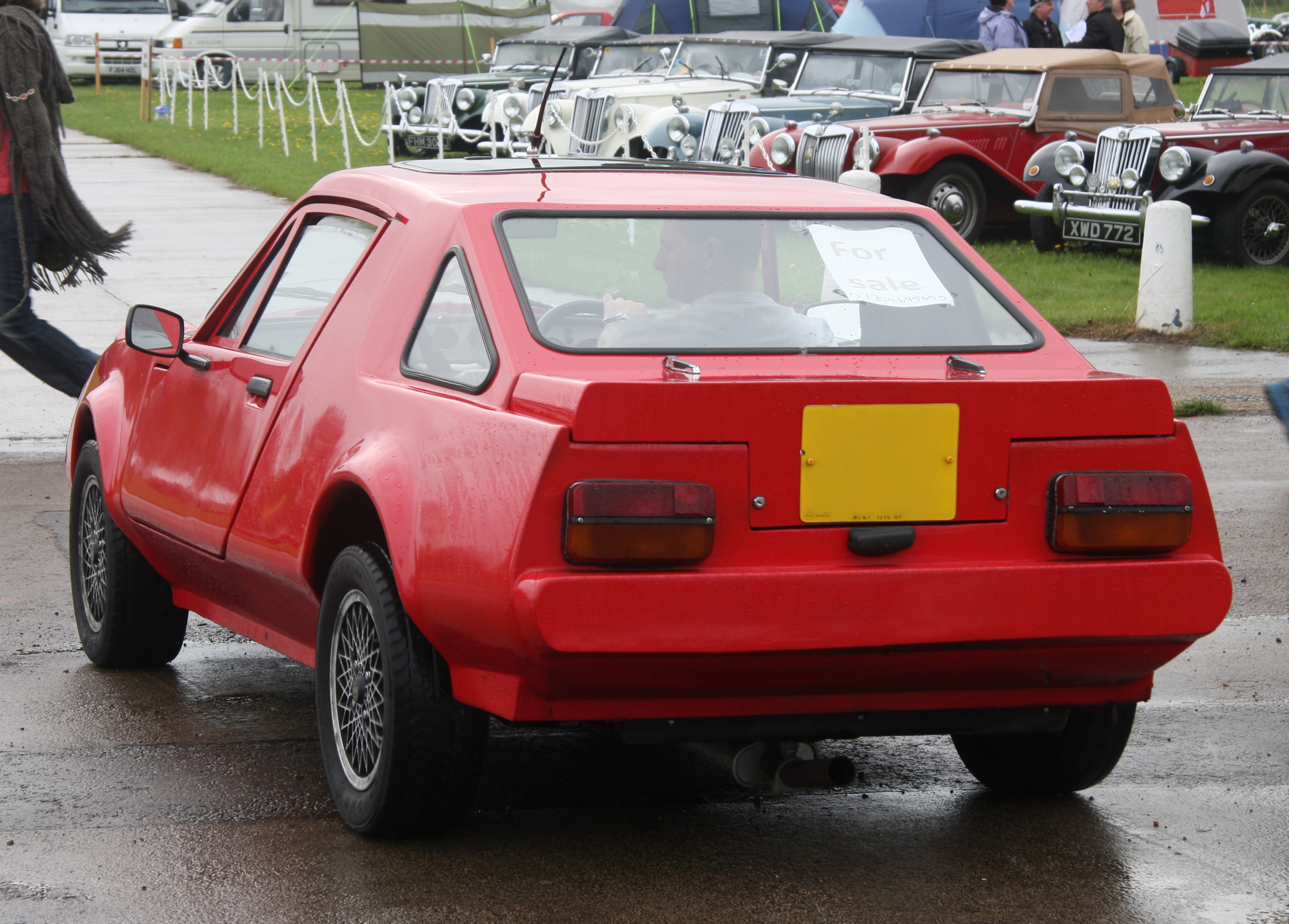
McCoy, with Mini 1275GT underpinnings

The McCoy was a Mini-based version of the Clan, developed in 1984 by Arthur Birchall, another of the original Clan company founders. The car used a Mini engine and other parts and was thus front-engined and front-wheel-drive. The body too underwent some changes, with different glazing and a reworked rear-end.

The Mini's tall A-series engine also necessitated a modified, bulkier front. Much of the original Clan's sleekness was lost, but the McCoy still looked less awkward than many other Mini-based specials. The McCoy means that Clans and their derivative automobiles have been marketed with the engine mounted in the rear, front, as well as midships.

== Clan Club ==
As of 2024, the Clan Club is active, where bodyshell and panels can be purchased.

== See also ==
- List of car manufacturers of the United Kingdom
