= KMC International Center =

College campus in Manipal, Kamataka, India

Coordinates: 13.354757°N 74.787562°E

Kasturba Medical College International Center
- Type: Private
- Established: October 2005
- Endowment: Unknown
- Chancellor: Dr. Ramdas M. Pai
- Dean: Dr. Poornima B. Baliga
- Faculty: 52
- Students: Unknown
- Location: Manipal, Karnataka, India
- Campus: Small Town
- Website: KMCIC Medicine

The Kasturba Medical College International Center (KMCIC) was the Manipal, India campus of American University of Antigua College of Medicine. The college was forged with an agreement between Manipal University (formerly known as the Manipal Academy of Higher Education) and the American University of Antigua College of Medicine (since purchased by The Manipal Group). KMCIC was established in October 2005, with a focus to train undergraduate and graduate students in the Basic Sciences of the medical curriculum in preparation for the USMLE Step 1 Examinations. KMCIC functions as a distinct college of Manipal University, with its own administrative body led by Dean Poornima Baliga. It started to phase out students from its campus in Manipal and relocate them to AUA's Pre-Medical and Basic Science campus in Antigua in 2011. As of 2015, no students are currently enrolled at KMCIC's Manipal campus. AUA has since then dissolved that campus after receiving California site selection approval among other states as AUA site is highly favorable among many states for placement of students. Manipal campus in its entirety is left with only secretarial and administrative staff on hand in Manipal serving to provide former students transcripts and paperwork where needed.

== Recognition ==
Coursework done at KMCIC is not recognized for licensure in California and the many US states that follow the California model. The California Medical Board refuted the long-standing contention of American University of Antigua (AUA) that KMCIC was part of the AUA campus. KMCIC students are certified for USMLE Step 1 after completing their 'Preliminary Clinical Training / Internal Medicine I' semester. Mr. William Kelly, ECFMG's Associate Vice President of Operations has confirmed in correspondence with Mr. Neal Simon, President of AUA that KMCIC students (AUA students who begin in the Manipal Campus) are allowed to be certified by AUA for their USMLE.

=== Medical Council of India ===
KMCIC is not recognized by the Medical Council of India, as it does not fulfill MBBS-granting licensing requirements as set by the Council. KMCIC students rather fulfilled US licensing requirements prior to graduation.

=== IMED ===
KMCIC is second academic campus of American University of Antigua College of Medicine. Thus AUA's IMED listing applies to KMCIC as well.

== Student life ==
Students had a few officially recognized organizations to join. These included Medical Students Aiding in India's Development (MSAID) and Student Council. There were cultural performances spread throughout the year performed by other colleges, which KMCIC students would watch, or even participate in. The most famous of these was the annual Utsav celebration which is still held by other Manipal institutions today.

Most student culture involved sports such as cricket, soccer, basketball, or visits to local sights such as End Point, Udupi and Mangalore.

=== Classroom ===
The semesters were organized differently from traditional American schools. Currently, there are 3 rotating entry semesters (March, July, September).

=== Student Council ===
The official liaison between all KMCIC students and the administration of Dean Poornima Baliga, this body of students conveyed messages and initiated dialogue and diplomacy in favor of student needs. The organization conducted weekly meetings with all executive members and class representatives present. The President and Vice President dialogue directly with the Dean.

=== Class Representatives ===
Class Representatives were an integral part of the Council and the experience in KMCIC. A student was elected from within a batch to stand as a liaison between the class, student council, the faculty and the administration. The duties of the CR were controversial. The students were elected for the term of 1 semester, and may be reelected repeatedly until their completion of the Basic Sciences semesters in Manipal.

=== MSAID ===
Medical Students Aiding in India's Development is a volunteer charity and social organization.

=== Annual Day ===
An annual tradition celebrated as a tour de force of each college in the Manipal Campus.

=== White Coat Ceremony ===
Upon completion of the 'Preliminary Clinical Training / Internal Medicine I' semester, there used to be an official White Coat ceremony held at Chaitya Hall, Valley View Hotel. This event signified the completion of the batch's time at Manipal.

== Teaching affiliates ==
- T.M.A.Pai Hospital Udupi, India
- St. Elizabeths Hospital Washington D.C., USA

== See also ==
- Manipal
- Manipal University
- American University of Antigua College of Medicine
- Educational Commission for Foreign Medical Graduates
- International medical graduate
