= Kaisis Motor Company =

Kaisis Motor Company (KMC) was a vehicle manufacturer in Cyprus, in business between 1973 and the late 1980s. The branding takes after the name of the founder, Andreas Kaisis, a local entrepreneur. KMC manufactured (in most cases assembled) trucks, buses, and many speciality vehicles such as ambulances, fire engines and airport vehicles (e.g. mobile stair vehicles). The first models were based on British Dennis models.

== History ==
In 1974 the company started producing trucks based on Commer, Dodge and M.A.N. designs. The company produced several other vehicle types, including a number of van and bus designs (such as the Commer/Dodge PB SpaceVan series, the Dodge Walk-thru van range and the Dodge Commando series) and a 6x6 military truck. It also ventured into the 4x4 market with several unsuccessful models (some based on Romanian ARO models). Beyond the small Cypriot market, KMC sold its vehicles to over 20 countries, mostly in the Middle East.

Of note was the company's purchase (in 1974) of the blueprints to the Clan sports car, designed by a team of former Lotus engineers, with plans to set up an assembly line in KMC's new factory near Nicosia International Airport. This activity was cut short after the Turkish invasion of Cyprus in 1974 when the new factory was caught in the buffer zone and thus had to be evacuated. The factory sits vacant to this day.

== Gallery ==
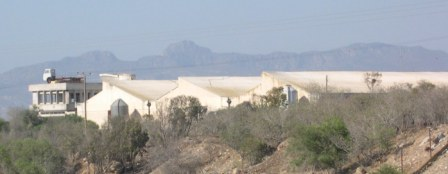
Photo of the abandoned factory which was completed right before the Turkish Invasion of Cyprus in 1974 but was caught in the UN buffer zone after the ceasefire. A derelict truck can be seen on the roof of the office block on the left.

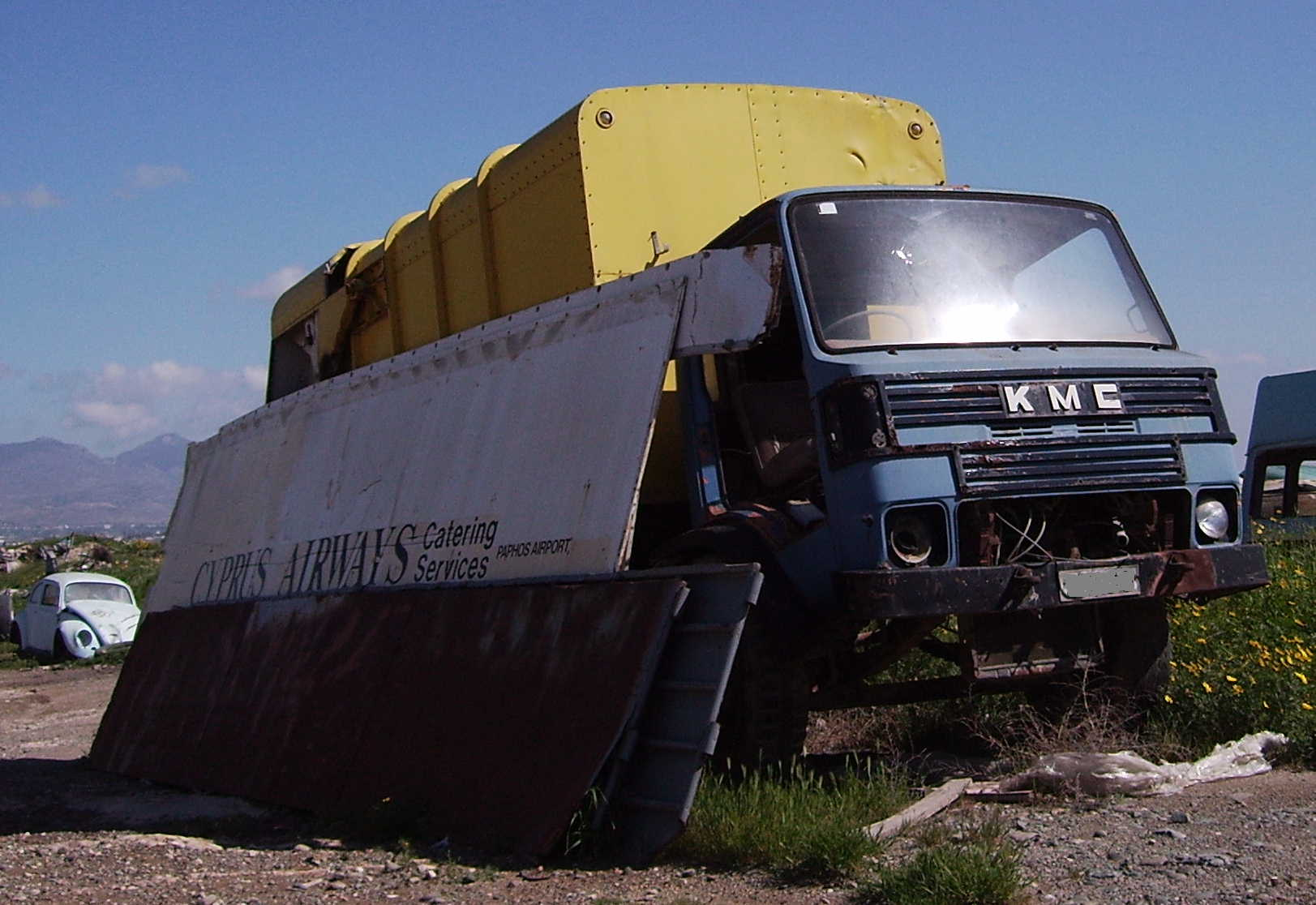
Abandoned KMC waste collection vehicle.This model was based on the Dodge 100 Commando.

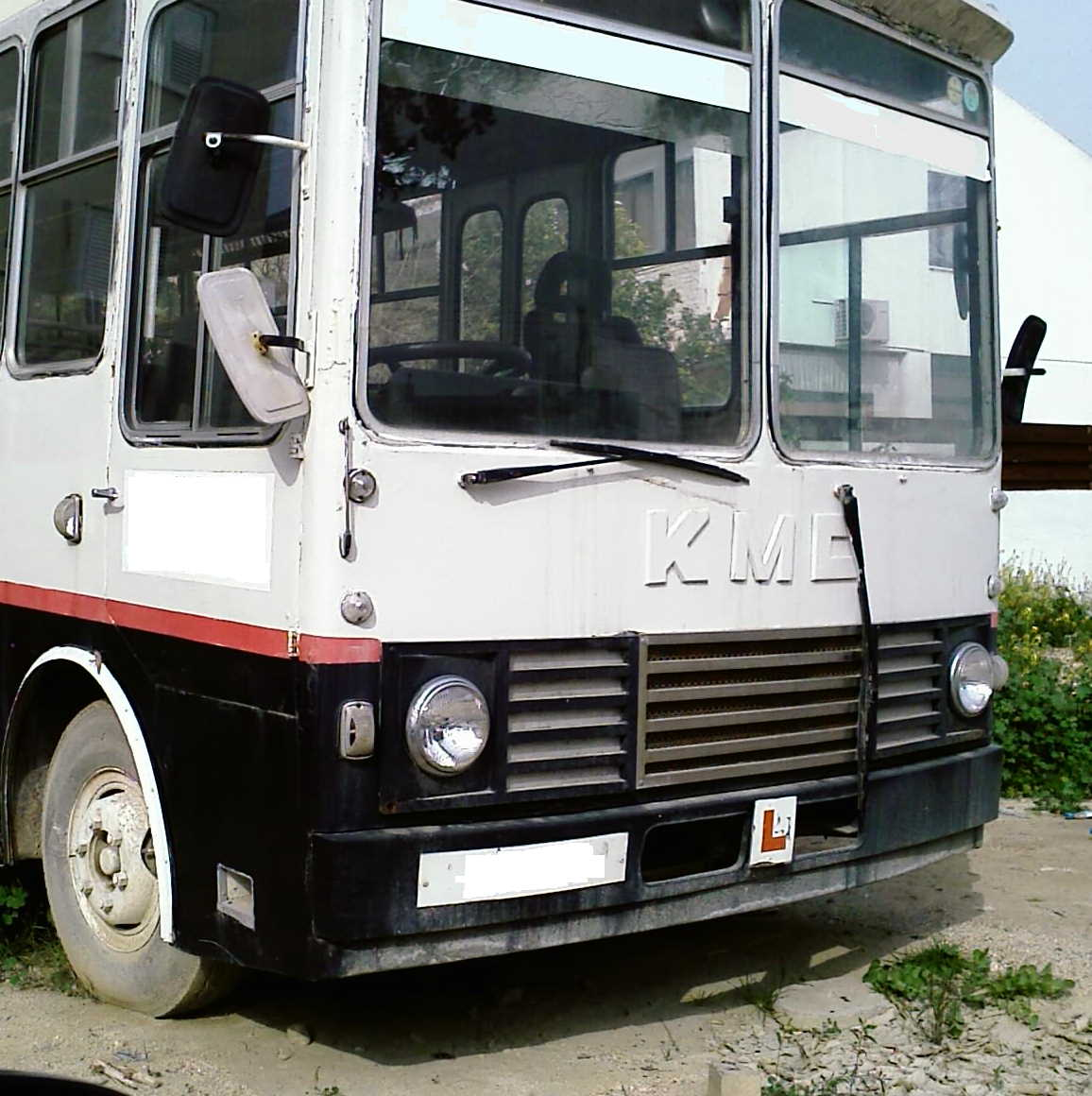
Abandoned KMC bus.

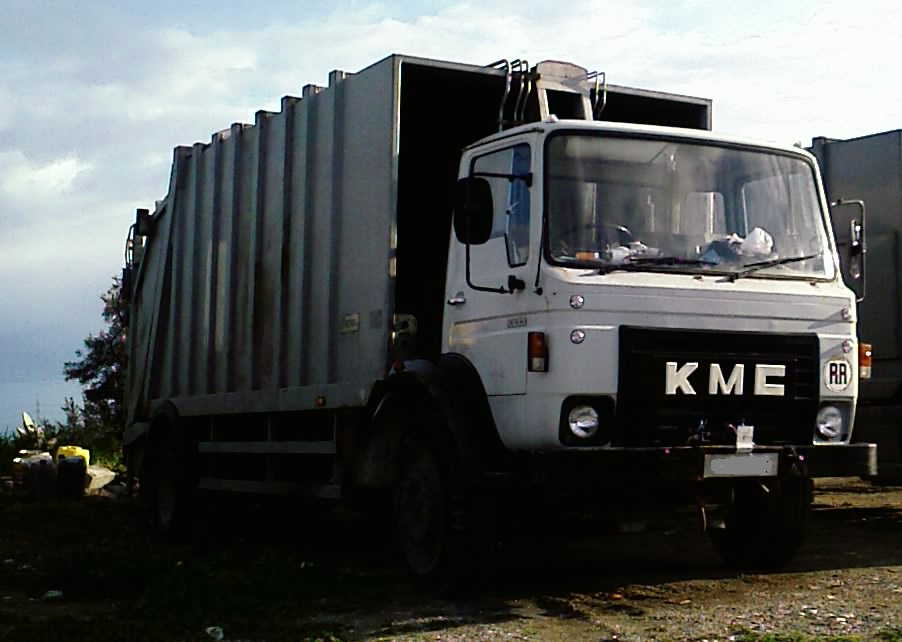
KMC waste collection vehicle still in use.
