= Search and rescue =

Search for and provision of aid to people who are in distress or imminent danger

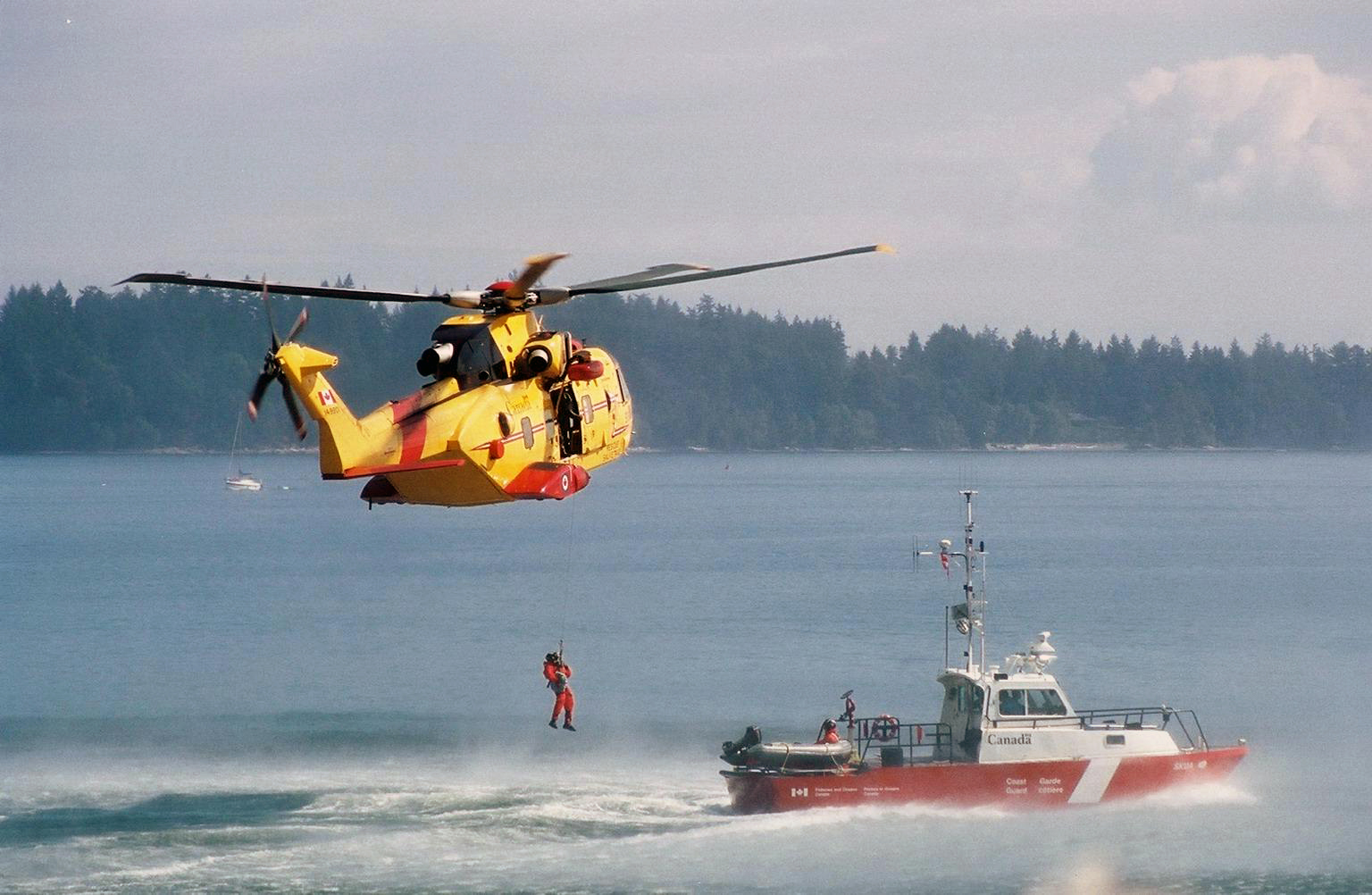
A Canadian Forces AgustaWestland CH-149 Cormorant helicopter hoists a man from a Canadian Coast Guard ship

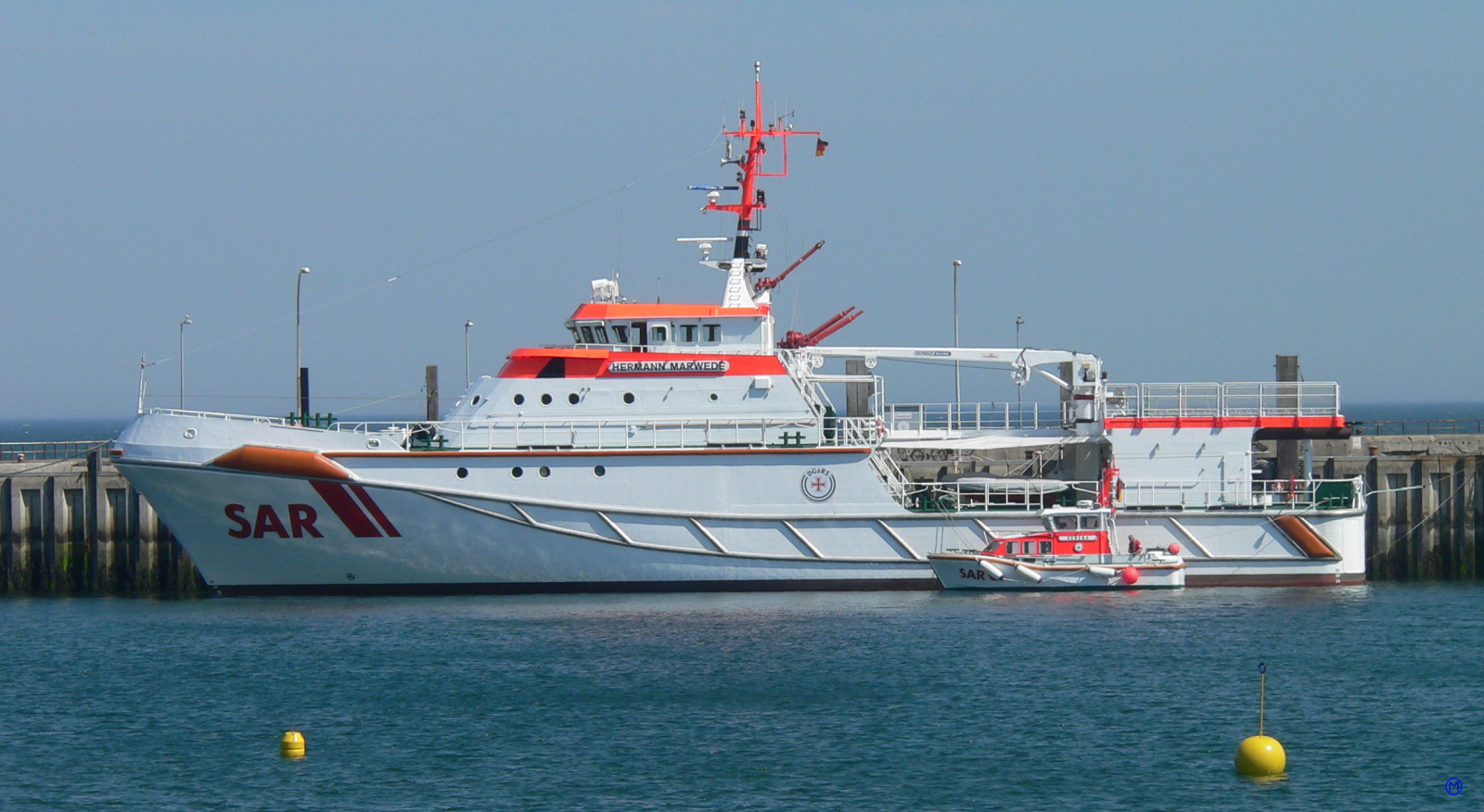
A SAR cruiser of the German Maritime Search and Rescue Service

Search and rescue (SAR) is the search for and provision of aid to people who are in distress or imminent danger. The general field of search and rescue includes many specialty sub-fields, typically determined by the type of terrain the search is conducted over. These include mountain rescue; ground search and rescue, including the use of search and rescue dogs (such as K9 units); urban search and rescue in cities; combat search and rescue on the battlefield and air-sea rescue over water.

The International Search and Rescue Advisory Group (INSARAG) is a UN organisation that promotes the exchange of information between national urban search and rescue organisations. The duty to render assistance is covered by Article 98 of the UNCLOS.

== Definitions ==
There are many different definitions of search and rescue, depending on the agency involved and country in question.

- Canadian Armed Forces and Canadian Coast Guard: "Search and Rescue comprises the search for, and provision of aid to, persons, ships or other craft which are, or are feared to be, in distress or imminent danger."
- United States Coast Guard: "The use of available resources to assist persons or property in potential or actual distress."
- United States Department of Defense: A search is "an operation normally coordinated by a Rescue Coordination Center (RCC) or rescue sub-center, using available personnel and facilities to locate persons in distress" and rescue is "an operation to retrieve persons in distress, provide for their initial medical or other needs, and deliver them to a place of safety".

== History ==
One of the world's earliest well-documented SAR efforts ensued following the 1656 wreck of the Dutch merchant ship Vergulde Draeck off the west coast of Australia. Survivors sought help, and in response three separate SAR missions were conducted, without success.

On 29 November 1945, a Sikorsky R-5 performed the first civilian helicopter rescue operation in history, with Sikorsky's chief pilot Dmitry "Jimmy" Viner in the cockpit, using an experimental hoist developed jointly by Sikorsky and Breeze. All five crew members of an oil barge, which had run aground on Penfield Reef, were saved before the barge sank.

In 1983, Korean Air Lines Flight 007 with 269 occupants was shot down by a Soviet aircraft near Sakhalin. The Soviets sent SAR helicopters and boats to Soviet waters, while a search and rescue operation was initiated by U.S., South Korean, and Japanese ships and aircraft in international waters, but no survivors were found.

In July 2009, Air France Flight 447 was lost in the middle of the Atlantic Ocean. An international SAR effort was launched, to no avail. A third effort nearly two years later discovered the crash site and recovered the flight recorders.

In early 2014, Malaysia Airlines Flight 370 crashed under mysterious circumstances. Many nations contributed to the initial SAR effort, which was fruitless. In June 2014, the Australian Transport Safety Bureau commissioned the MV Fugro Equator to lead a three-month survey of the ocean bed. As of 2014, the search for Flight 370 had become the largest SAR to date.

== Types of search and rescue ==
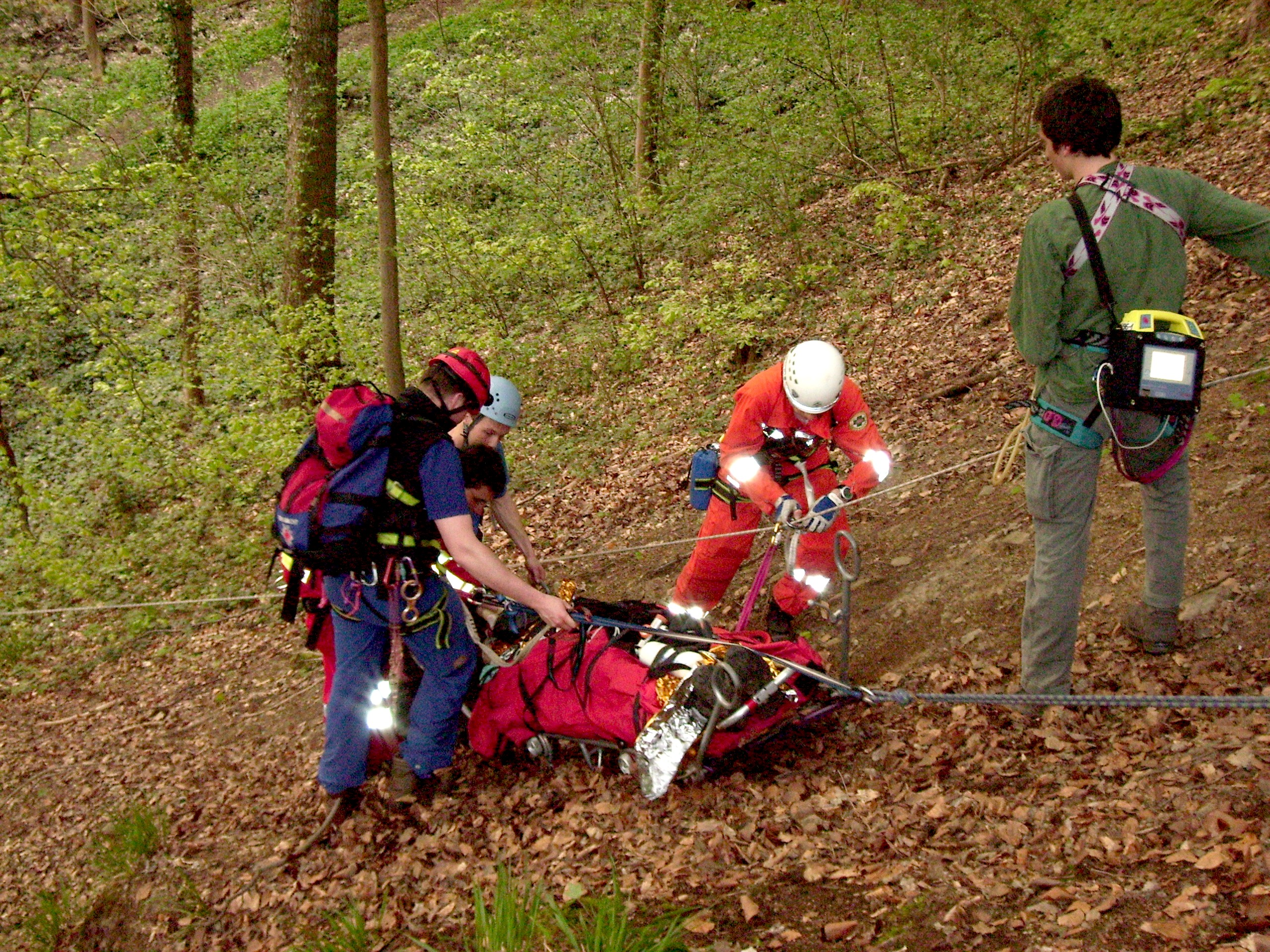
Rescue rope training

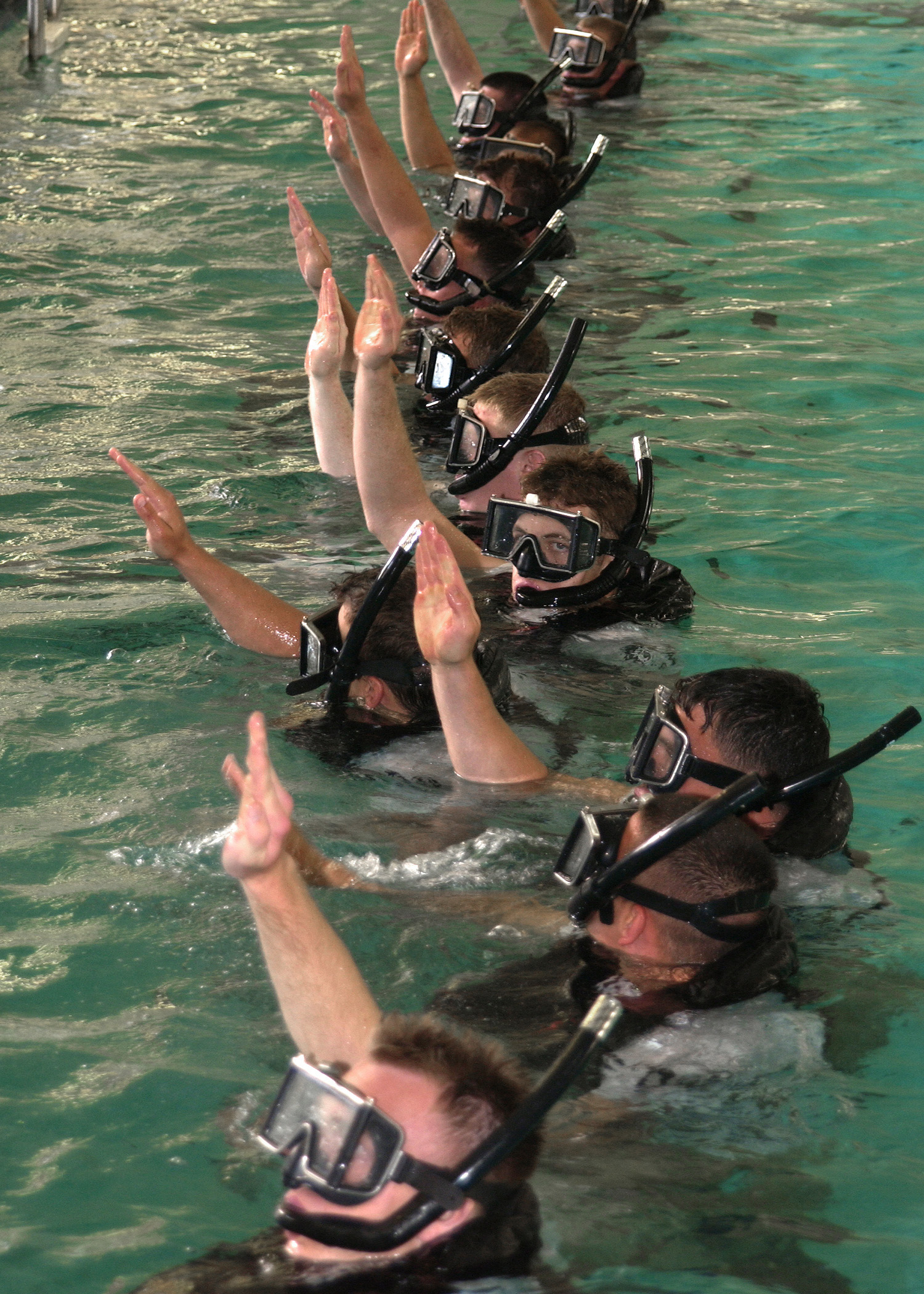
Search and Rescue students give the "I am all right" signal to let the SAR instructors know that they are ready for further instructions at the pool on board Naval Station San Diego.

=== Ground (lowland) search and rescue ===
Ground search and rescue is the search for persons who are lost or in distress on land or inland waterways. People may go missing for a variety of reasons. Some may disappear voluntarily, due to issues like domestic abuse. Others disappear for involuntary reasons such as mental illness, getting lost, an accident, death in a location where they cannot be found or, less commonly, due to abduction. Ground search and rescue missions that occur in urban areas should not be confused with "urban search and rescue", which in many jurisdictions refers to the location and extraction of people from collapsed buildings or other entrapments.

In some countries, the police are the primary agency for carrying out searches for a missing person on land. Some places have voluntary search and rescue teams that can be called out to assist these searches.

Search and rescue agencies may contain small specialist teams for executing operations where there are specific environmental risks. Examples include swift water rescue, flood response, technical rope rescue, confined space rescue, over-snow rescue, and thin ice rescue.

=== Mountain rescue ===
Mountain rescue relates to search and rescue operations specifically in rugged and mountainous terrain.

=== Cave rescue ===
Cave rescue is a highly specialised form of rescue for rescuing injured, trapped or lost cave explorers.

=== Urban search and rescue ===
Urban search and rescue (US&R or USAR), also referred to as Heavy Urban Search and Rescue (HUSAR), is the location and rescue of persons from collapsed buildings or other urban and industrial entrapments. Due to the specialised nature of the work, most teams are multi-disciplinary and include personnel from police, fire and emergency medical services. Unlike traditional ground search and rescue workers, most US&R responders also have basic training in structural collapse and the dangers associated with live electrical wires, broken natural gas lines and other hazards. While earthquakes have traditionally been the cause of US&R operations, terrorist attacks and extreme weather such as tornadoes and hurricanes have also resulted in the deployment of these resources.

=== Combat search and rescue ===
Combat search and rescue (CSAR) is search and rescue operations that are carried out during war that are within or near combat zones.

=== Maritime search and rescue ===
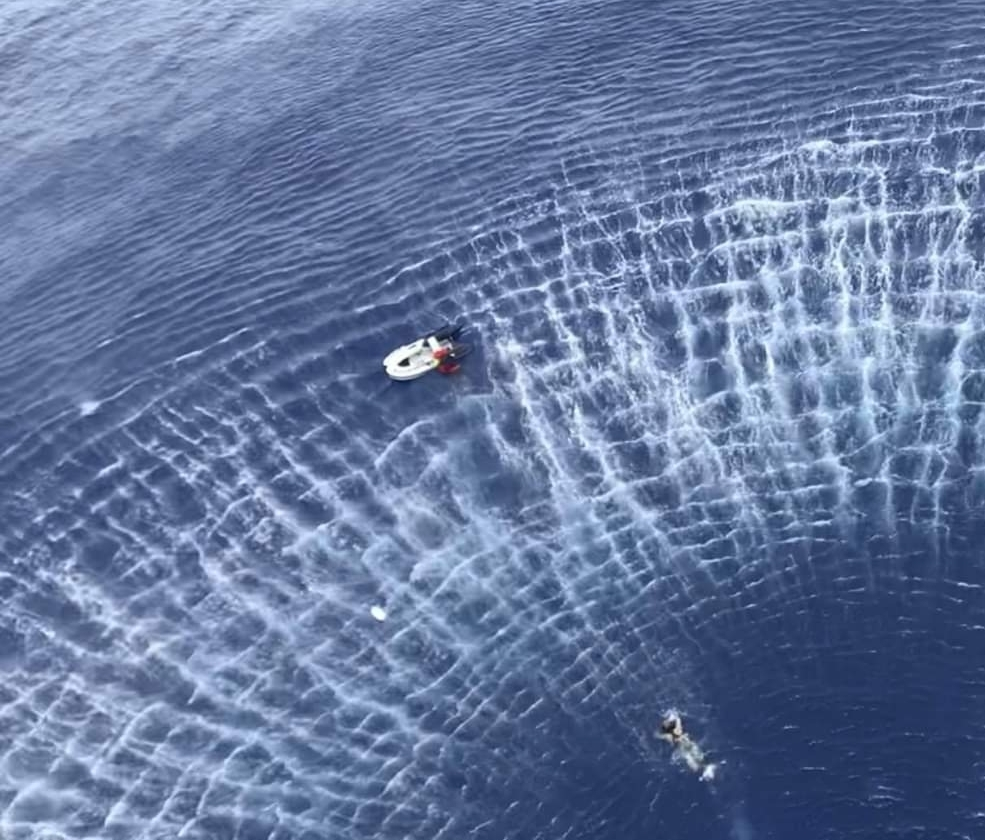
A US Navy rescue swimmer swims toward a stranded boat near Guam in 2019

Maritime search and rescue is carried out at sea to save sailors and passengers in distress, or the survivors of downed aircraft. The type of agency which carries out maritime search and rescue varies by country; it may variously be the coast guard, navy or voluntary organisations. When a distressed or missing vessel is located, these organisations deploy helicopters, rescue vessels or any other appropriate vessel to return them to land. In some cases, the agencies may carry out an air-sea rescue (ASR). This refers to the combined use of aircraft (such as flying boats, floatplanes, amphibious helicopters and non-amphibious helicopters equipped with hoists) and surface vessels. Another type of Maritime search and rescue is Submarine rescue. The International Convention on Maritime Search and Rescue (SAR Convention) is the legal framework that applies to international maritime and air-sea rescue.

== By nation ==
=== Australia ===
National

The Australian search and rescue service is provided by three authorities; the Joint Rescue Coordination Centre (JRCC) at the Australian Maritime Safety Authority (AMSA), the Australian Defence Force (ADF) and the State/Territory Police Jurisdictions. In a very broad sense, the JRCC respond to national and international registered aircraft, off shore marine incidents and beacon activations. The ADF are responsible for Australian and foreign military personnel, vehicles, vessels and aircraft while within the Australian SRR. Police are responsible for coastal marine incidents, lost persons, unregistered aircraft, inland waterways, ports and identified beacons. The JRCC operates a 24-hour Rescue Coordination Centre (RCC) in Canberra and is responsible for the national coordination of both maritime and aviation search and rescue. The JRCC is also responsible for the management and operation of the Australian ground segment of the Cospas-Sarsat distress beacon detection system. The JRCC's jurisdiction spans Australia and as well as covering 52.8 million square kilometres of the Indian, Pacific and Southern Oceans constituting about 11% of the Earth's surface.

The JRCC is staffed by SAR specialists who have a naval, merchant marine, air force, civil aviation or police service background. The JRCC also coordinates medical evacuations, broadcasts maritime safety information and operates the Australian Ship Reporting System (AUSREP). In coordinating search and rescue missions, the JRCC will call on assistance from organisations as appropriate, such as the Defence forces, Border Protection Command, trained aviation organisations (Civil SAR Units), emergency medical helicopters, state Police services and trained Air Observers from the State Emergency Service. There are also other organisations, such as the non-profit Westpac Life Saver Rescue Helicopter Service that is based at a number of sites around Australia and contracted by various authorities to deliver search and rescue services.

State

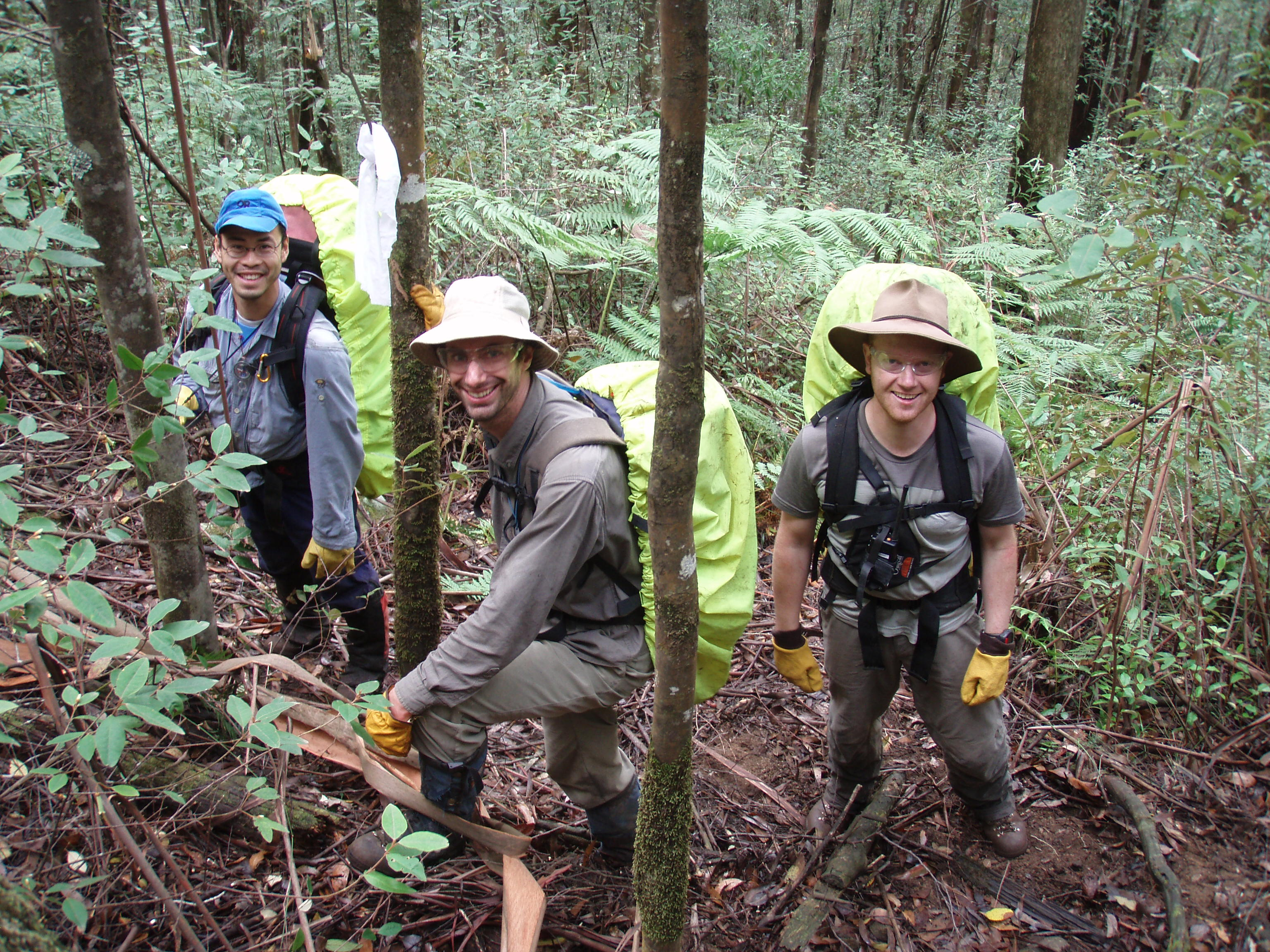
BSAR searchers at Mount Dom Dom.

State Police in many states operate state-based search and rescue squads, such as the Victoria Police Search and Rescue Squad, which provides specialist expertise, advice and practical assistance in land search and rescue on most terrain including snow and vertical cliff search and rescue. There are also state-based volunteer search and rescue groups such as the NSW SES Bush Search and Rescue in New South Wales and Bush Search and Rescue Victoria in Victoria. These state-based groups draw searchers from bushwalking, mountaineering and specialist rescue clubs within their State. A few groups respond on horseback as mounted search and rescue. The State Emergency Service is a collection of volunteer-based emergency organisations established in each state or territory which are responsible for many rescue efforts in urban and rural areas and in any rescue that results from flood or storm activity. In rural areas the SES conducts most bush search, vertical and road traffic rescues. In urban areas they assist the police and fire services with USAR.

=== Azerbaijan ===
Search and rescue operations in Azerbaijan are managed by the Ministry of Emergency Situations onshore in cooperation with the State Civil Aviation Administration in air and the State Maritime Administration offshore.

=== Belgium ===
Search and rescue duties along the Belgian part of the North Sea are executed by the Belgian Air Component. From its Koksijde Air Base it operates NH-90 helicopters.

=== Brazil ===
Search and rescue duties in Brazil are the responsibility of the Salvarmar Brasil (MRCC Brazil), of the Brazilian Navy and Divisão de Busca e Salvamento (D-SAR) (English: Search and Rescue Division), of the Brazilian Air Force.

=== Canada ===
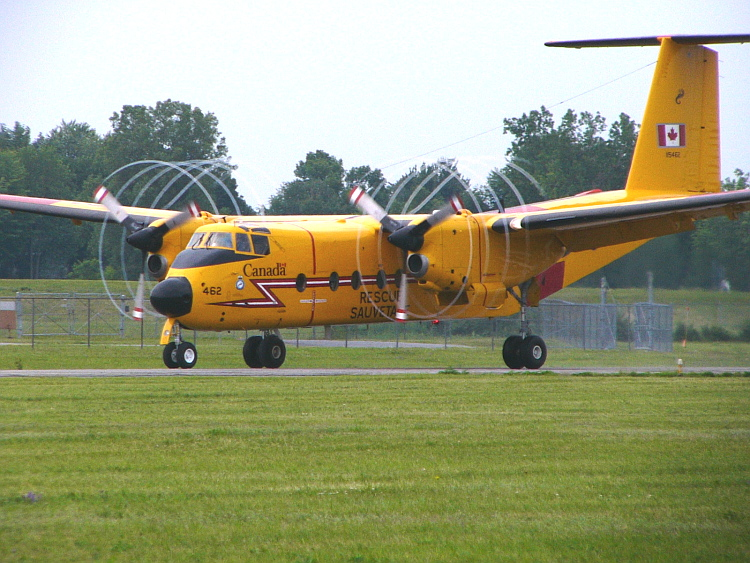
Canadian Armed Forces CC-115 Buffalo fixed wing SAR aircraft from 442 Transport and Rescue Squadron.

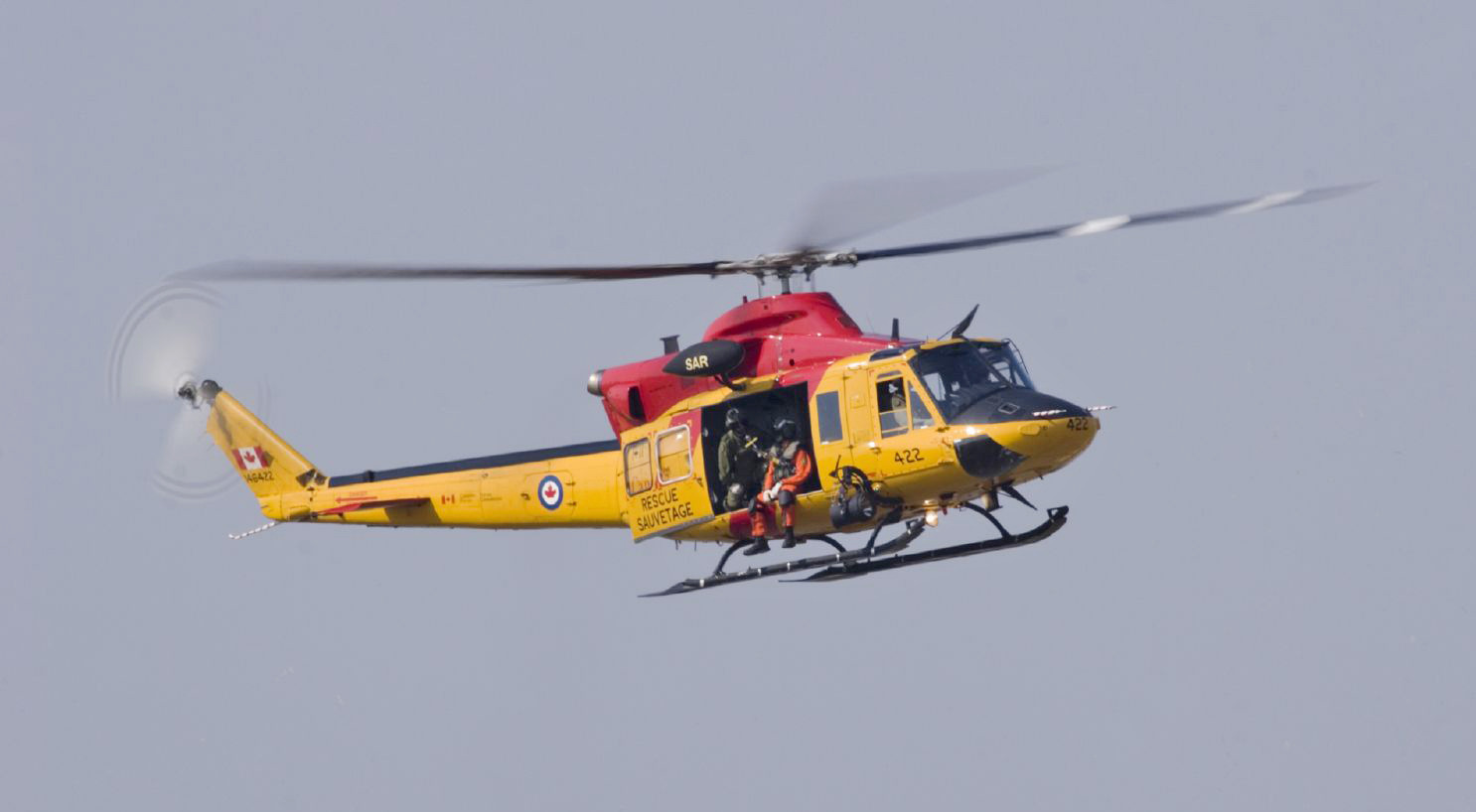
CH-146 Griffon in SAR markings

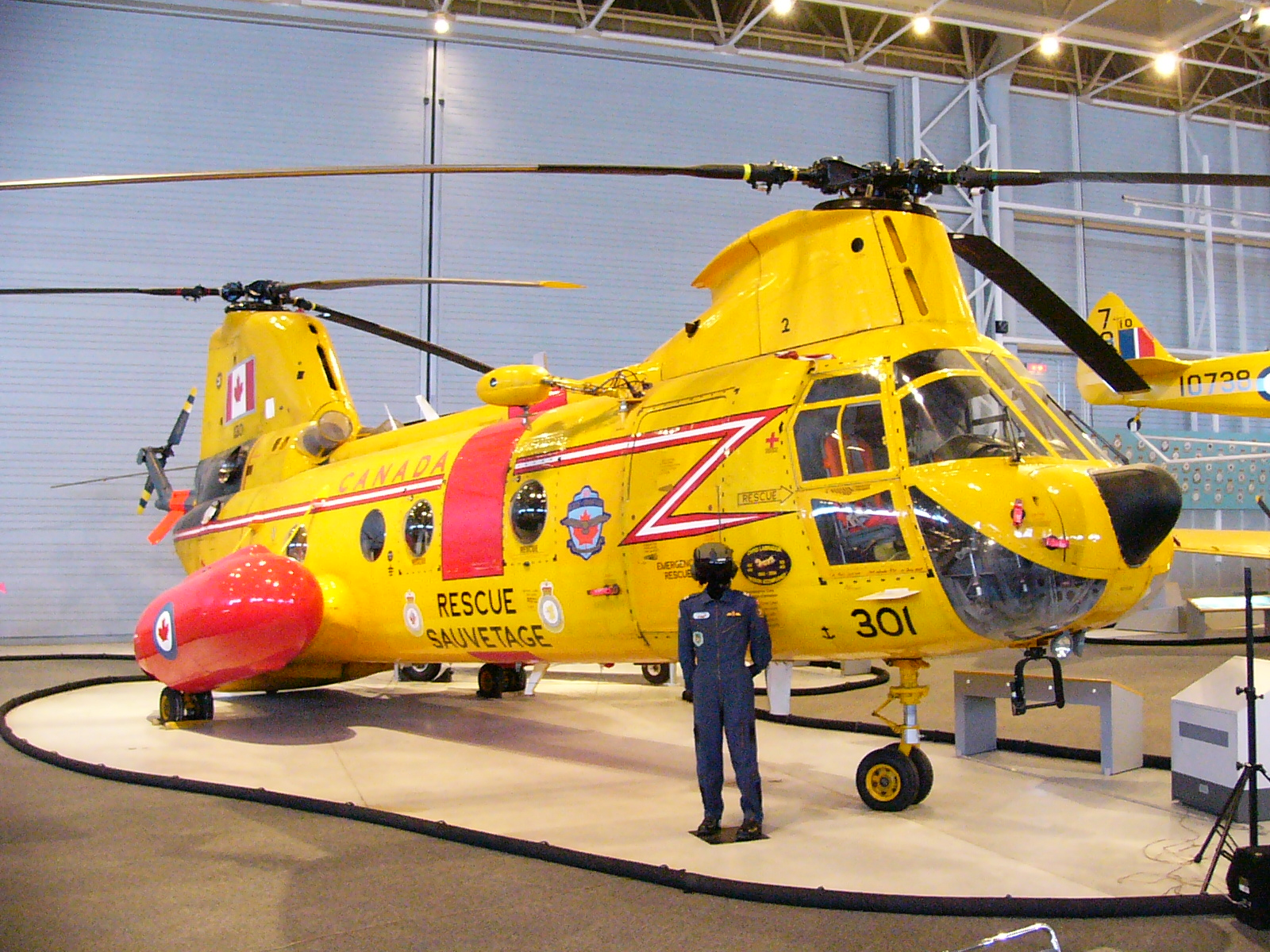
Boeing-Vertol CH-113 Labrador SAR helicopter, the predecessor of the CH-149 Cormorant

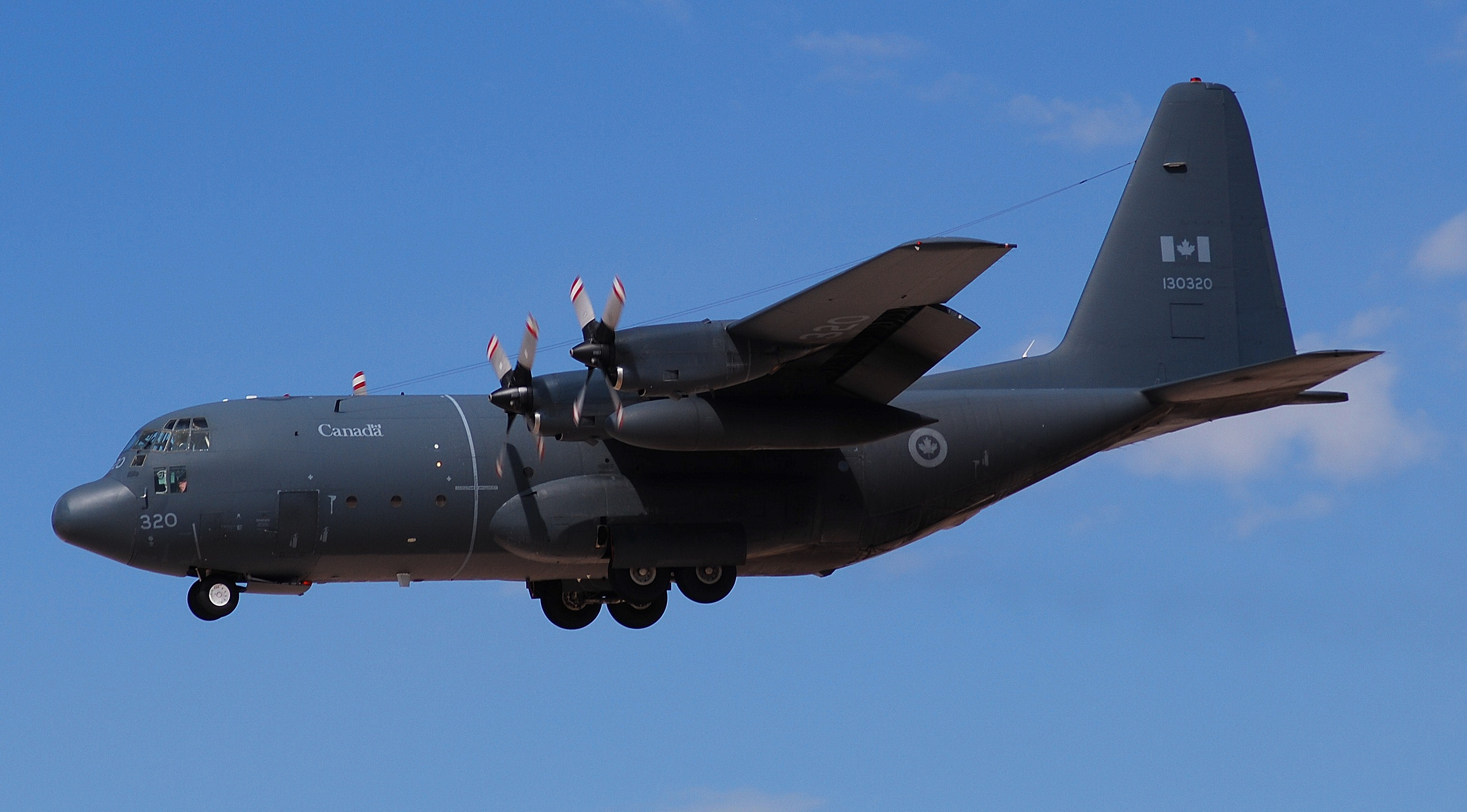
C-130 are also used by the Canadian Armed Forces for SAR operations

Air and marine search and rescue (SAR) in Canada is delivered through the National Search and Rescue Program, a federal framework involving several government departments and volunteer organizations. Aeronautical and maritime SAR operations are coordinated by Joint Rescue Coordination Centres (JRCCs) located in Halifax, Trenton, and Victoria.

Primary responsibility for maritime SAR lies with the Canadian Coast Guard, while the Canadian Armed Forces provide aircraft, crews, and specialized rescue personnel. The Department of National Defence has overall responsibility for the coordinated SAR system.

Volunteer marine search and rescue services are provided by units of the Canadian Coast Guard Auxiliary, a nationwide network of community-based organizations that assist the Canadian Coast Guard in responding to maritime incidents. The Auxiliary includes more than 4,000 volunteers operating over 1,000 vessels across Canada's coastal and inland waters. Canada records roughly 7,000 marine and humanitarian search and rescue incidents annually, and Auxiliary units respond to approximately one quarter of these calls while working alongside federal and local emergency services.

Ground and inland water search and rescue (GSAR) is the responsibility of provinces and territories, with the Royal Canadian Mounted Police (RCMP) and other police forces coordinating operations, often using volunteer GSAR teams operating under provincial coordinating bodies.

The Canada Shipping Act, most recently passed in 2001, is the framework document that funds international SAR activities.

The Canadian Armed Forces have five assigned SAR squadrons:

- 103 Search and Rescue Squadron, CFB Gander, CH-149 Cormorant
- 413 Transport and Rescue Squadron, CFB Greenwood, CH-149 Cormorant & CC-130 Hercules
- 424 Transport and Rescue Squadron, CFB Trenton, CH-146 Griffon & CC-130 Hercules
- 435 Transport and Rescue Squadron, CFB Winnipeg, CC-130 Hercules
- 442 Transport and Rescue Squadron, CFB Comox, CH-149 Cormorant & CC-295 Kingfisher

Plus three Combat Support Squadrons with SAR roles:

- 417 Combat Support Squadron, CFB Cold Lake, CH-146 Griffon
- 439 Combat Support Squadron, CFB Bagotville, CH-146 Griffon
- 444 Combat Support Squadron, CFB Goose Bay, CH-146 Griffon

==== Volunteer marine search and rescue ====
Volunteer marine search and rescue services in Canada are provided by the Canadian Coast Guard Auxiliary (CCGA), a nationwide network of community-based volunteer organizations that assist the Canadian Coast Guard in responding to maritime incidents. Auxiliary members are typically experienced recreational boaters or commercial mariners who operate either their own vessels or dedicated rescue craft when tasked by a Joint Rescue Coordination Centre.

The CCGA includes more than 4,000 volunteers operating over 1,000 vessels across Canada’s coastal and inland waters. Each year Canada records roughly 7,000 marine and humanitarian search and rescue incidents, and Auxiliary units respond to approximately one quarter of these calls while working alongside the Canadian Coast Guard and other emergency services.

Some municipalities and provinces have their own SAR units:

- Halton Regional Police Service Marine Unit – using marine craft on Lake Ontario
- Toronto Police Service Marine Unit – using marine craft on Lake Ontario
- Peel Regional Police Marine Unit – using marine craft on Lake Ontario and rivers in Peel Region
- Ontario Provincial Police Marine Unit – using marine craft on Great Lakes (excluding Lake Michigan) and Georgian Bay
- Durham Regional Police Marine Unit – using marine craft on Lake Ontario and lakes within Durham Region
- York Regional Police Marine Unit – using marine craft on Lake Simcoe
- Niagara Regional Police Marine Unit – using marine craft on Niagara River and Lake Ontario
- Vancouver Police Department – using marine craft on waterways around the City of Vancouver
- Heavy Urban Search and Rescue (Toronto) – using land base equipment
- Brockville Police Service Marine Patrol Unit – using a boat on the St. Lawrence River

Ground SAR in Canada is generally the legislated responsibility of the local police.

In addition to police response, there are many volunteer non-profit associations that conduct SAR in Canada including:

- British Columbia, there are 78 community based volunteer Groups in B.C. providing GSAR services within assigned areas in conjunction with Police, ambulance and other agencies. The GSAR Groups are represented by the British Columbia Search and Rescue Association
  - Member teams include North Shore Rescue, British Columbia.
- Alberta / BC Cave Rescue, Alberta/British Columbia
- Canada Task Force 2, Alberta
- Civil Air Search and Rescue Association
- ERT Search and Rescue
- Grande Prairie Technical Search and Rescue Association, Alberta
- Halifax Regional Search and Rescue – Nova Scotia
- Pincher Creek Search and Rescue, Alberta
- Québec Secours, Québec.
- River Valley Ground Search and Rescue, New Brunswick
- Roberts Bank Lifeboat – Delta, BC
- Royal Canadian Marine Search and Rescue (RCM SAR)
- Sauvetage Bénévole Outaouais – Ottawa Volunteer Search and Rescue – Ottawa, ON and Gatineau, QC
- Search and Rescue Manitoba (SARMAN), Manitoba
- Vancouver Urban Search and Rescue (Canadian Task Force One), British Columbia
- York Sunbury Search & Rescue – New Brunswick

=== Croatia ===
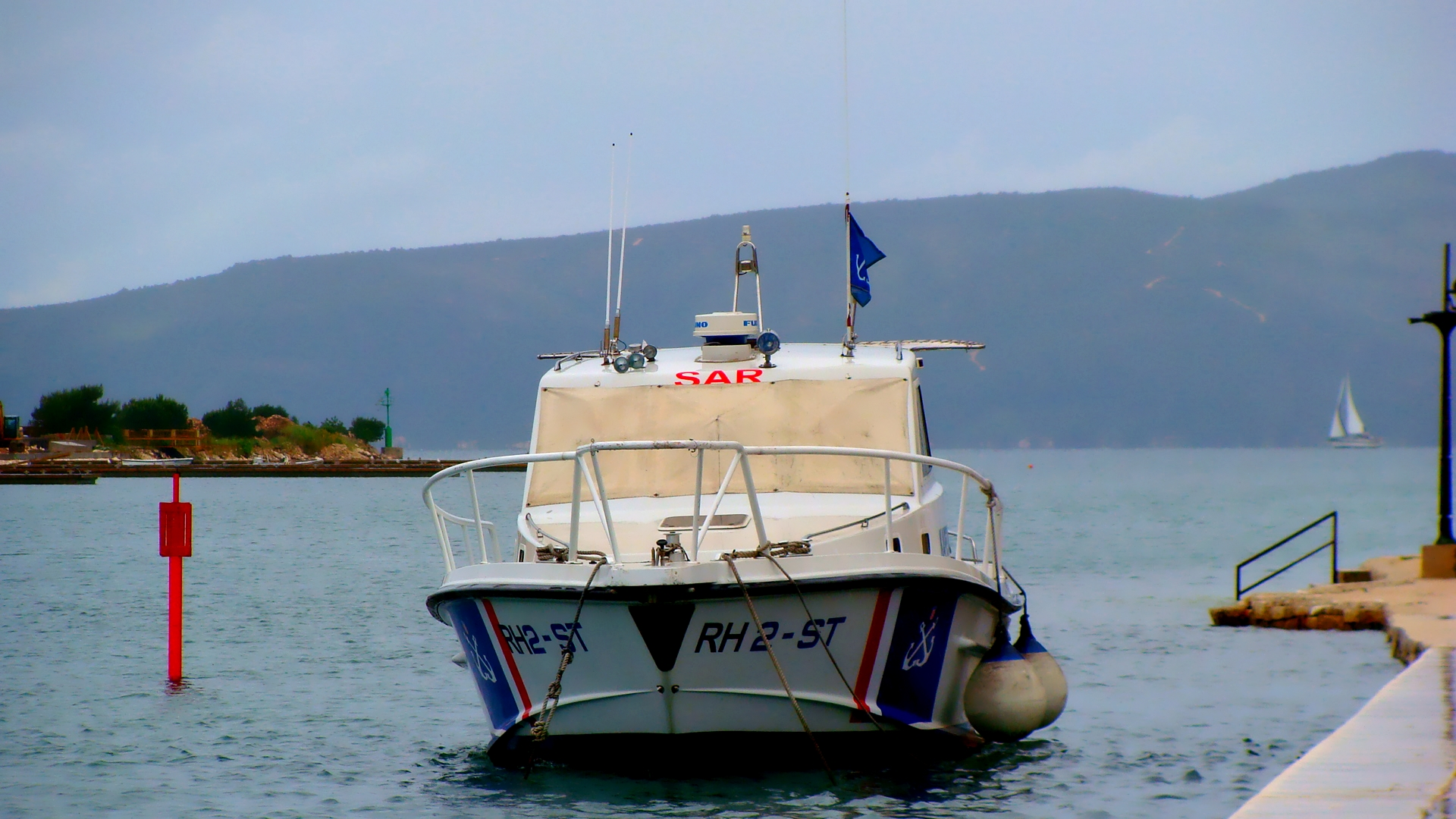
A boat of the Search and Rescue Service in Trogir, Spring 2014

In Croatia the SAR Service is part of the Croatian Navy and the Croatian Coast Guard with their headquarters in Rijeka.

=== Cyprus ===
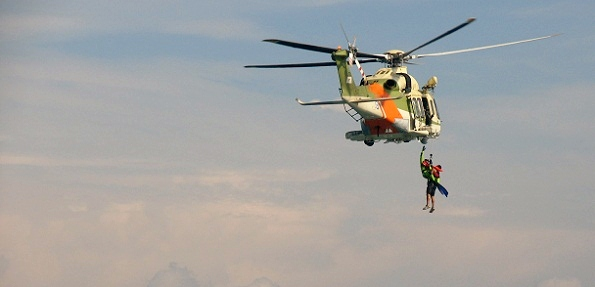
A Cyprus Air Force AW139 SAR helicopter during a search and rescue demonstration

The Cyprus Republic Search and Rescue (SAR) system is organised by the Cyprus Joint Rescue Coordination Center (JRCC Larnaca).

The JRCC (Greek: Κέντρο Συντονισμού Έρευνας και Διάσωσης) is an independent agency of the Ministry of Defence of the Republic of Cyprus that started its operations on a 24h basis on 7 August 1995 as a unit of the Cyprus Air Force Command.

On 1 March 2002, the JRCC took full responsibility for investigating, organising, coordinating and executing every SAR incident-operation in the Republic of Cyprus Search & Rescue Region (SRR). JRCC Larnaca operated as a military unit until 26 July 2010, when JRCC was transformed to an independent agency under the Ministry of Defence with the Minister being responsible for its operational aspects. Logistic and technical support is the responsibility of the Ministry of Communications & Works. Its primary mission is to organise the Cyprus Republic Search And Rescue system, to co-ordinate, control and direct SAR operations in its area of responsibility (which is identical to the Nicosia FIR), in order to find and rescue people whose lives are at risk, as a result of an air or naval accident, in the least possible time. This is achieved by coordinating all the different agencies involved such as the Cyprus Police Aviation Unit, the Cyprus Port and Naval Police, the Cyprus National Guard Naval Command, the Cyprus National Guard Air Force Command, the Cyprus Civil Defence and other secondary units.

The JRCC reports directly to the operational control of the Ministry of Defence and it is staffed by qualified personnel of the Cyprus National Guard, mainly from the branches of the Navy and the Air Force.

==== Northern Cyprus ====
There are also search and rescue teams in Northern Cyprus. Search and rescue operators in Turkish Republic of North Cyprus are primarily:

- SSTB Civil Defence Organisation Presidency (Turkish : Sivil Savunma Teşkilat Başkanlığı)
  - Emergency Management Committee
- DAK Search and Rescue in Natural Disasters (Turkish : Doğal Afetlerde Arama Kurtarma)
- AKUT TRNC

Military

- TRNC Coast Guard Command
- TRNC Coastal Safety (police)
- Security Forces Command Search and rescue teams.

=== Denmark ===
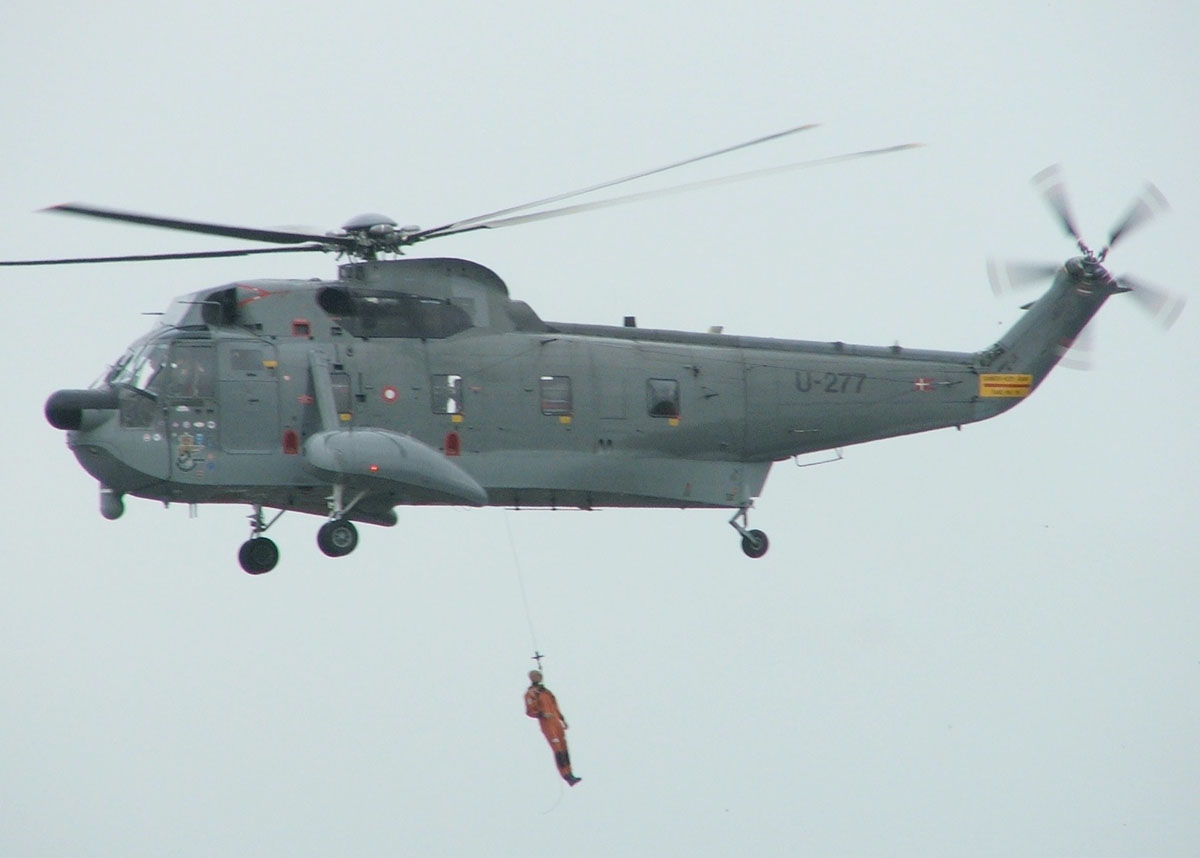
Royal Danish Air Force S-61A with its rescue swimmer

Search and rescue operators in Denmark are primarily: Danish air force Squadron 722, Danish navy air squadron, naval home guard and the Danish Maritime Safety Administration, coordinated by the Joint Rescue Coordination Centre, operated by the navy and air force in the Danish Naval Commands facilities near Aarhus. Internationally the Danish works mainly with Germany, Norway and Sweden. With the two latter, the annual exercises Baltic SAREX and Scan-SAR are conducted.

SAR services in Denmark started in 1957 with seven Sikorsky S-55s. Their piston engines produced only 550 hp (410 kW) and they had limited fuel capacity, so their operational range was short. To increase the operational area, Pembroke twin-engined fixed-wing aircraft were employed for search. These aircraft would localise the distressed person(s) and the S-55s would then rescue them. The SAR service was started for respond to fighter-plane crashes as 79 aircraft crashed, with 62 dead, in the period 1950–1955., but civilian SAR duties are also conducted.

In 1962, eight ship-based Aérospatiale Alouette IIIs were received. These were primarily meant for the ships patrolling the North Atlantic, but also supported the S-55s. In 1964–1965 the seven S-55s were replaced with eight Sikorsky S-61A helicopters.

In 2007, the Danish Defence held a public display in Horsens, to raise awareness about rescue services and maritime safety. Maritime SAR is important because Denmark has a relative long coast line to its land mass.

In 2008, the SAR forces in Denmark were equipped with eight EH-101, one or two Lynx, 34 naval home guard vessels and 21 rescue vessels, as well as the naval vessels at sea. The EH-101s operate from bases in Aalborg, Skrydstrup and Roskilde. When the sea water temperatures are low a helicopter is also deployed to the island of Bornholm in the Baltic Sea. The Lynx operates from Karup. Maritime vessels are spread out through the entire coastline and on islands. The S-61s and EH-101s have a crew of six: two pilots, a navigator, a flight engineer, a physician and a rescue swimmer.

=== Estonia ===
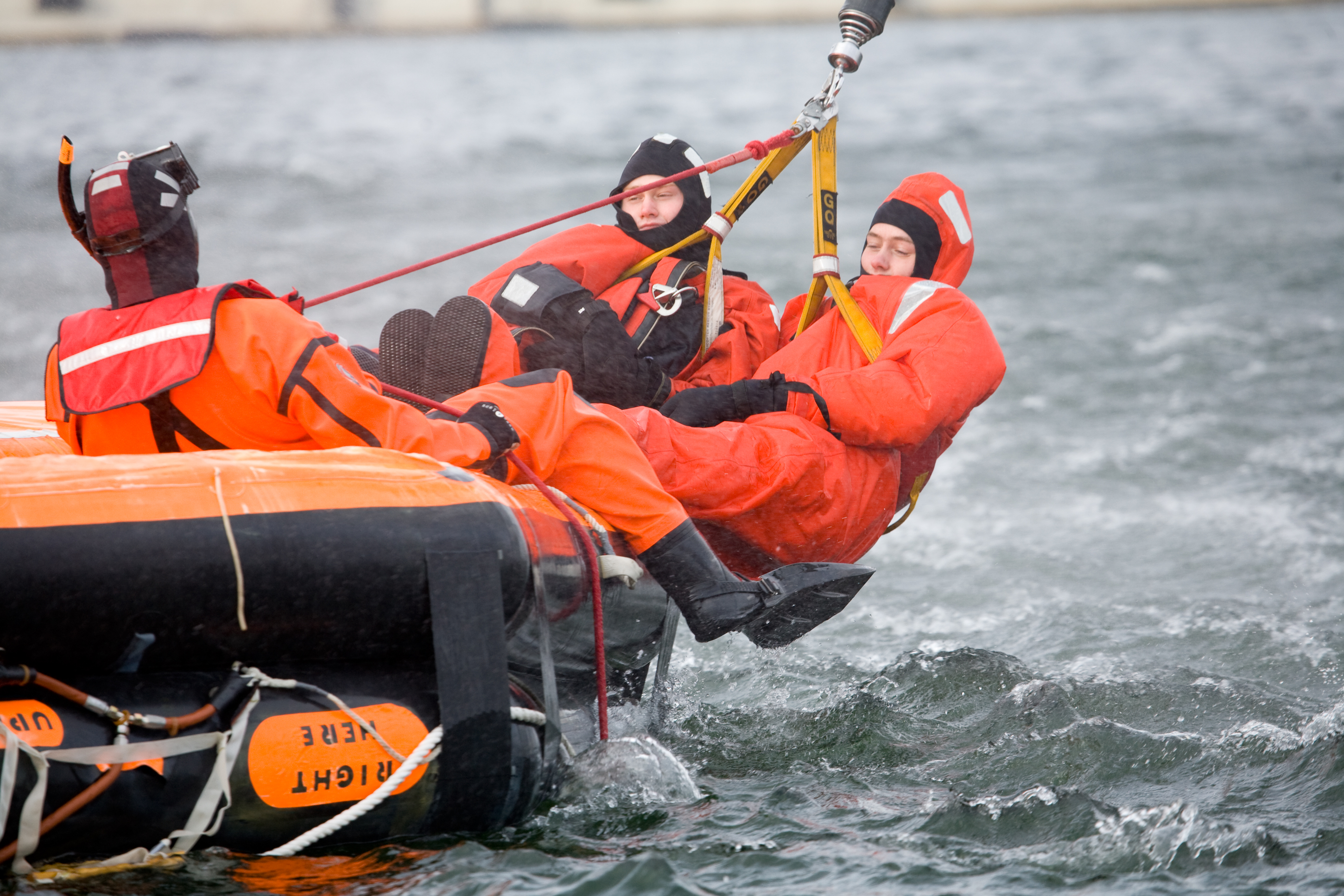
SAR training by the Estonian Border Guard.

The Estonian Border Guard (Piirivalve) is the Estonian security authority responsible for the border security. It is the main support organisation for search and rescue missions in Estonia, and operates a small fleet of SAR vessels and helicopters.

=== Finland ===
In Finland local rescue services (i.e. fire departments) are responsible for land and inland water SAR, the Border Guard is responsible for maritime areas. These organisations alert and decide on the most suitable response for the location and situation. The country also has several volunteer organisations such as the volunteer fire department (VPK), the Finnish Lifeboat Institution (SMPS) and the Red Cross Finland (SPR).

=== France ===
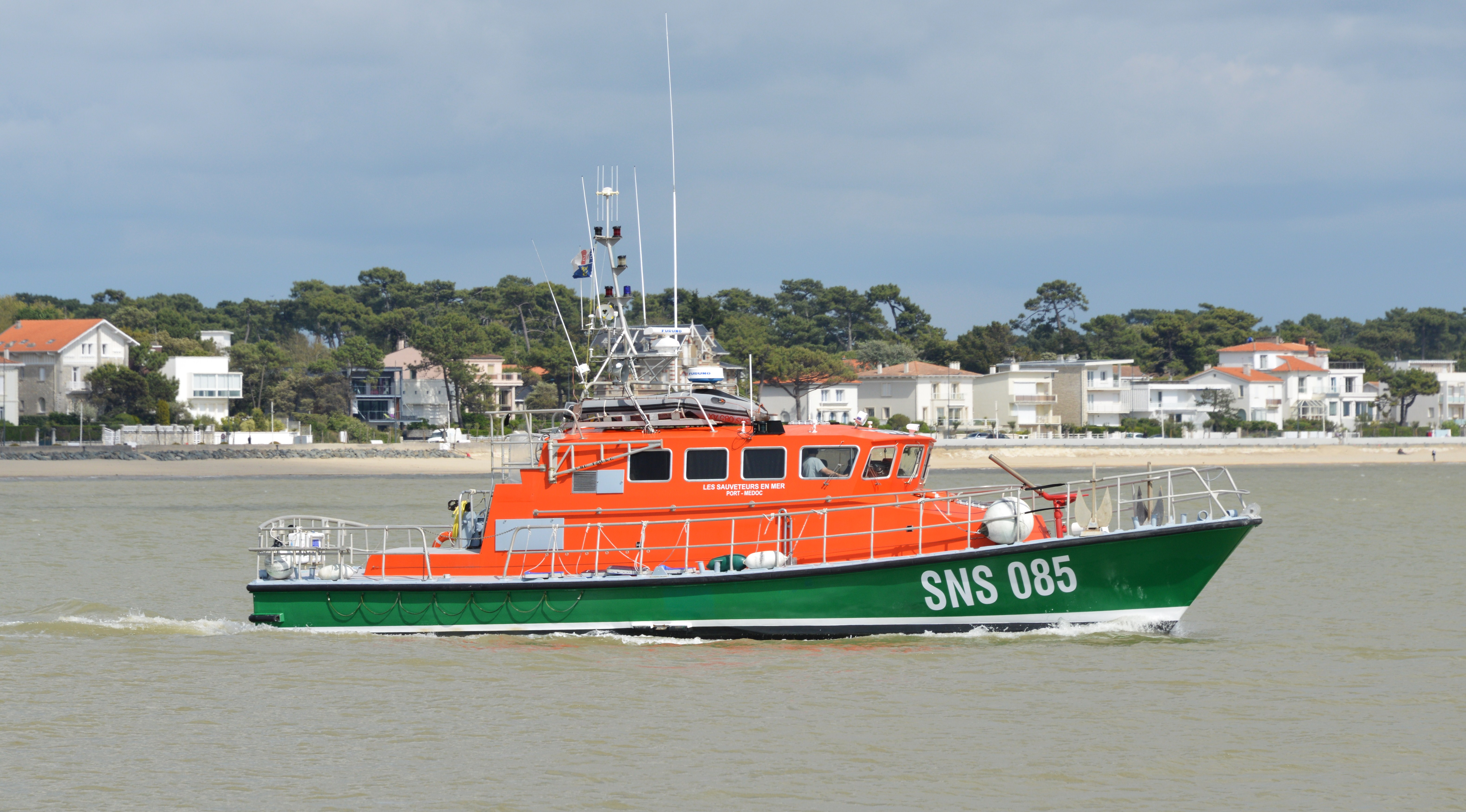
A French all-weather lifeboat from the SNSM.

The Société Nationale de Sauvetage en Mer (SNSM) provides sea rescue on the French coast and at seas. In 2016, they helped 7,500 people in 5,200 rescues. The service has 41 all-weather rescue boats, 34 first-class rescue boats and 76 second-class lifeboats. In France, Search and rescue operations are led by different entities according to the rescue area. For sea rescue, the French navy use airborne unit (e.g. Flottille 33F in Brittany) and specialised boats (e.g. "L'abeille Bourbon"). In Mountains, French gendarmerie is equipped with EC-145 'chouka'. In the other areas, French civil protection agency "Securité Civile" works with paramedics, fire unit and hospital mobile unit using EC-145 'Dragon'.

=== Germany ===
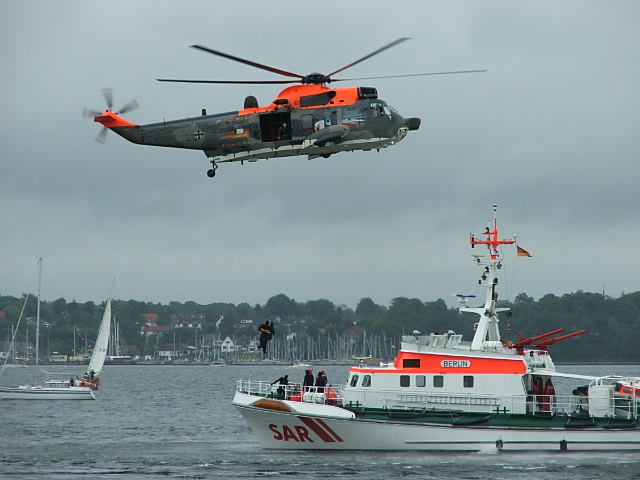
A cruiser of the DGzRS and a SeaKing helicopter of the German Navy

Search and Rescue in German waters is conducted by the German Maritime Search and Rescue Service with air support by the German Navy, the Federal Police and the German Army Aviation. All incoming requests are coordinated by the Maritime Rescue Coordination Center in Bremen. The DGzRS is a non-governmental organisation entirely supported by donations.

Besides the offshore Search And Rescue services, the German Army Aviation provides 3 SAR Command Posts on a 24/7 basis at Holzdorf Air Base with the Airbus H145 LUH SAR (Light Utility Helikopter Search and Rescue) and at Nörvenich Air Base and 2 at Niederstetten Army Airfield.

Further, the Technisches Hilfswerk is a key component of the German disaster relief framework. It is, among other things, regularly involved in urban search and rescue efforts abroad.

=== Hong Kong ===
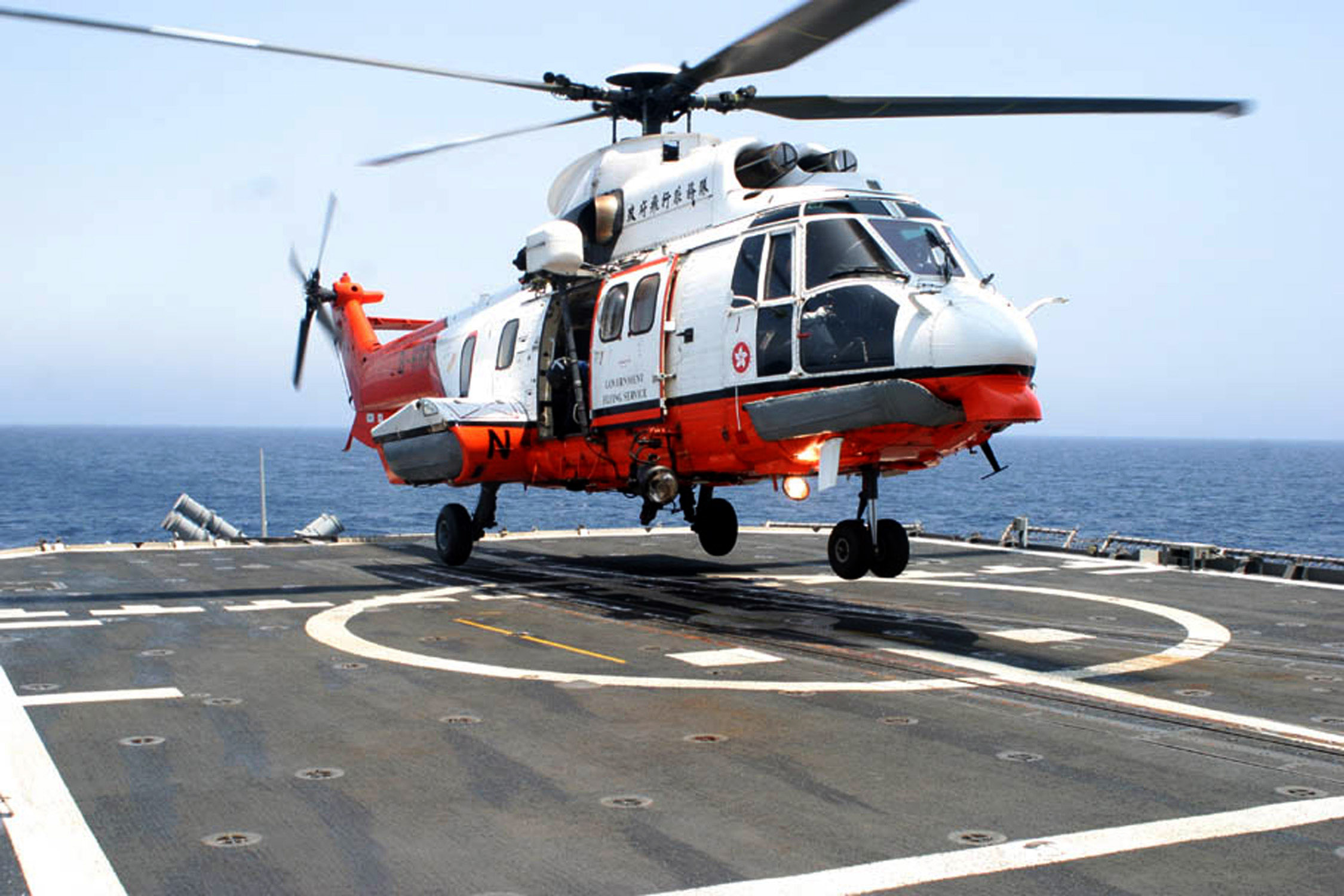
Hong Kong GFS AS332 L2 Super Puma SAR helicopter

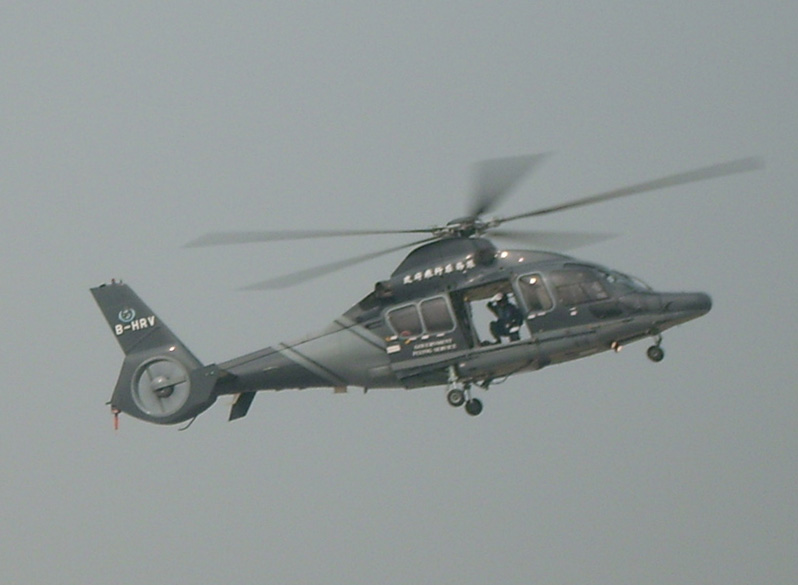
HK GFS EC155 helicopter

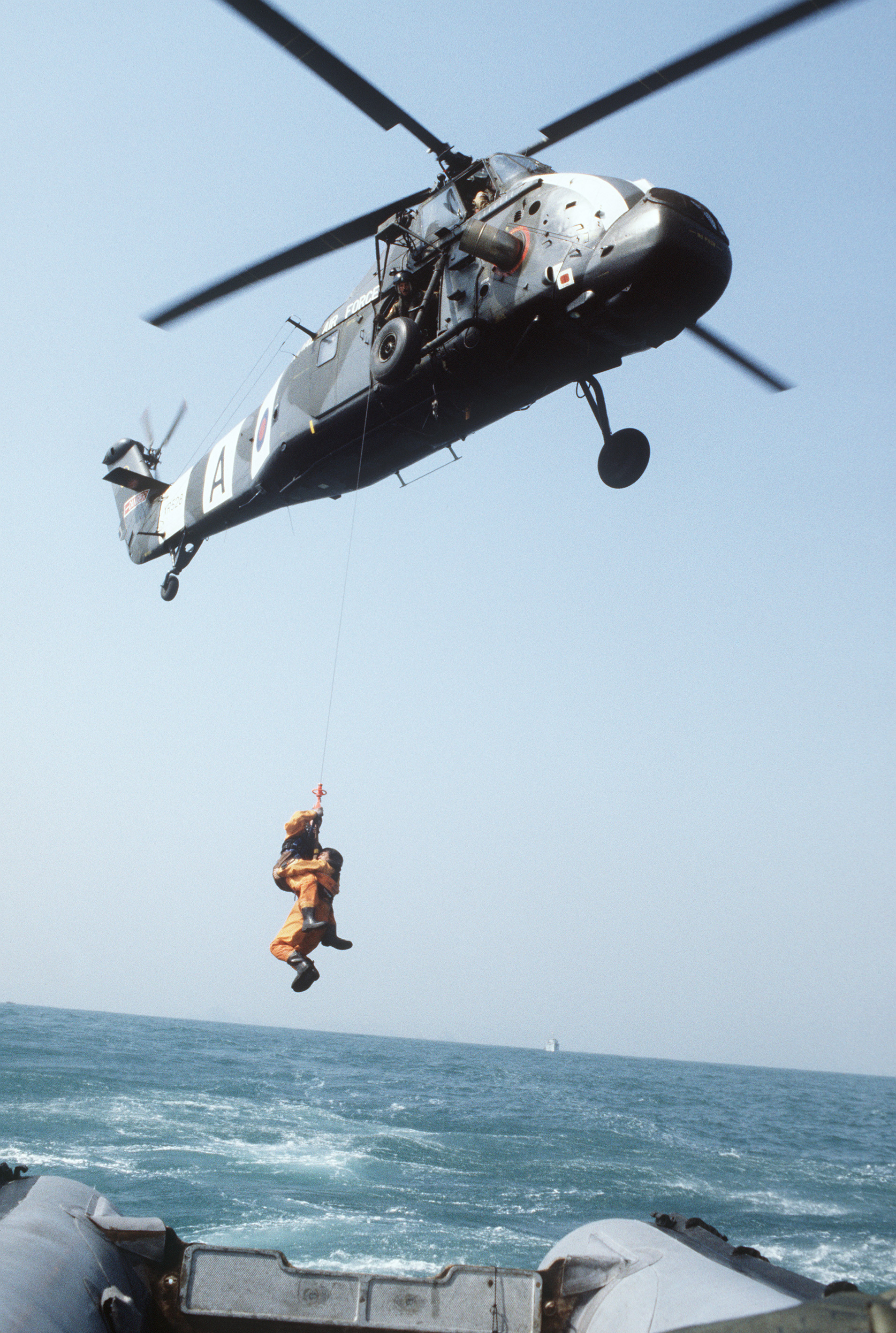
Royal Air Force Westland Wessex HC2 SAR helicopter off Hong Kong

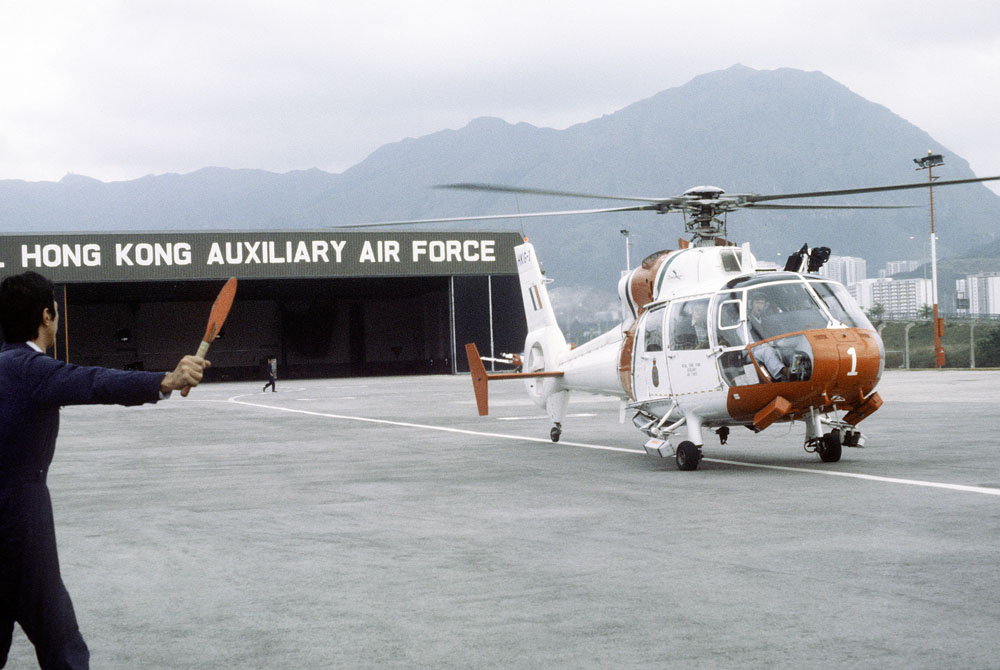
Royal Hong Kong Auxiliary Air Force Aérospatiale SA 360 Dauphin SAR helicopter

SAR operations are conducted by the Government Flying Service (GFS) and before 1993 by the Royal Hong Kong Auxiliary Air Force. The GFS conducts maritime SAR within the 400-nautical-mile (740 km) radius of the Hong Kong Flight Information Region (FIR).

As of 2020, the GFS fleet consists of nine aircraft including:

- 2 Bombardier Challenger 605 – for aerial SAR surveillance
- 7 Airbus Helicopters H175 – for inshore and offshore SAR

Other civilian search and rescue units in Hong Kong include:

- Civil Aid Service – works in conjunction with the Hong Kong Fire Services Dept and the air support from the Government Flying Service, also provides mountain rescue service
- Hong Kong Fire Services/Hong Kong Marine Police – various vessels and rescue divers – with air support from the GFS
- Hong Kong Maritime Rescue Co-ordination Centre is responsible for coordinating other civil agencies in regards to marine SAR operations in waters around Hong Kong
- Countryside Volunteer Search Team

=== Iceland ===
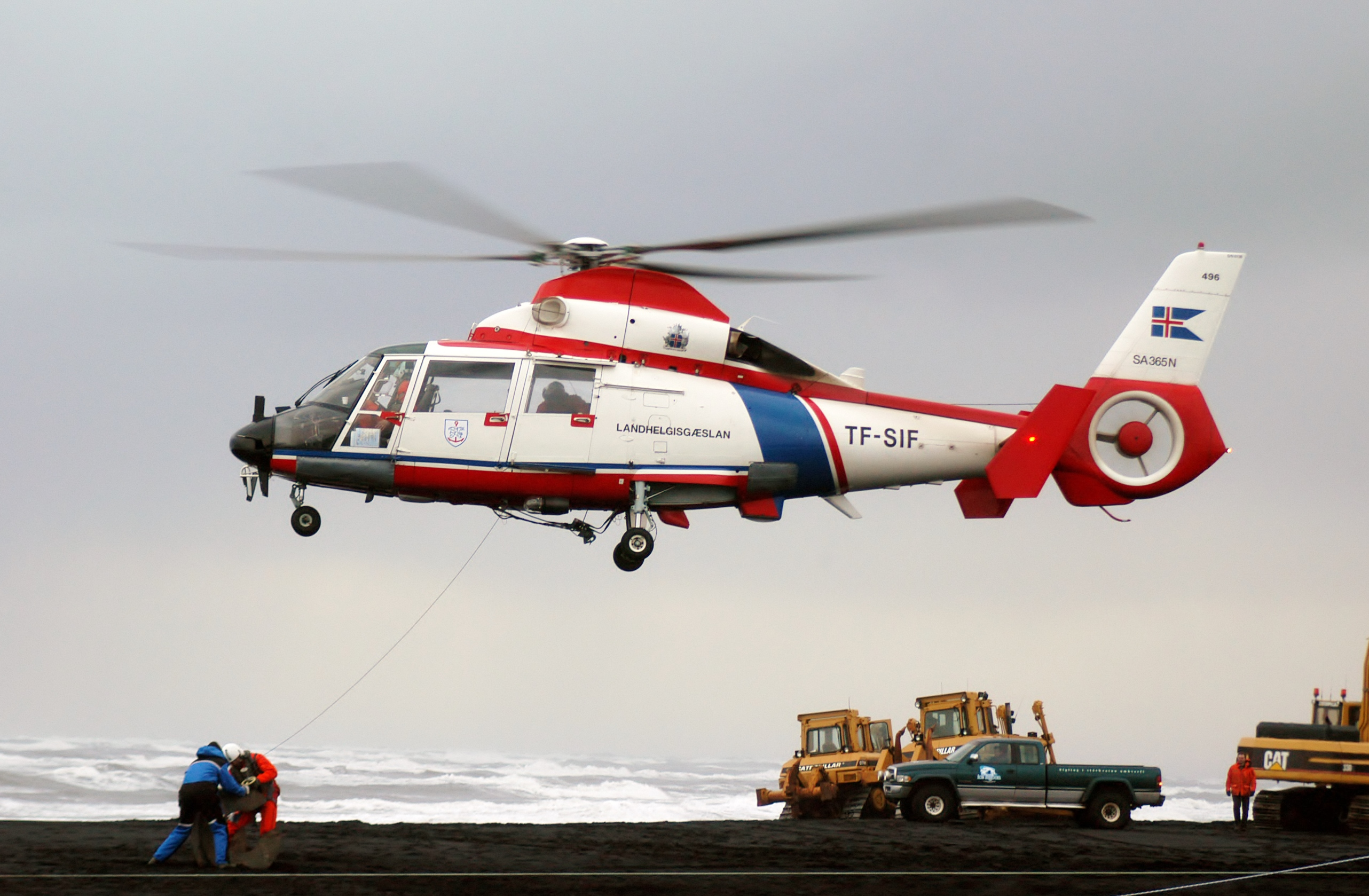
Icelandic Coast Guard Eurocopter AS-365N Dauphin 2 helicopter

The Icelandic Coast Guard is responsible for coordinating all maritime and aviation search and rescue activities in the Icelandic Search and Rescue Region (SRR), that has the size of 1.9 million square kilometres. The Icelandic Coast Guard operates JRCC ICELAND in combination with the Coast Guard's operation centre, the maritime traffic service and the coastal radio stations. If aircraft crash site is located on land the control of the rescue operations is diverted to the Icelandic Police, which is responsible for SAR operations on land. The Icelandic Coast Guard (JRCC ICELAND) is the Cospas-Sarsat SAR Point of Contact. ISAVIA, which operates the Air Traffic Control in Iceland, is responsible for the aviation alerting services. The Icelandic Coast Guard operates maritime patrol aircraft, SAR helicopters and patrol vessels.

The Icelandic Association for Search and Rescue (Slysavarnafélagið Landsbjörg) (ICESAR) is a volunteer organisation with about 100 rescue teams located all around the island. ICESAR is a great support to SAR operations both on land and sea. All the rescue teams contain groups of specially trained individuals.

A specialised INSARAG External Classification certified rubble rescue squad operates under the Icelandic Association of Search and Rescue. It was the first rescue squad to arrive in Haiti following the earthquake of 2010.

=== Indonesia ===
The National Search and Rescue Agency of Indonesia known in Indonesian as Badan Nasional Pencarian dan Pertolongan abbreviated "BASARNAS", is a government agency responsible for conducting search and rescue duties nationally in Indonesia. BASARNAS may also be assisted in conducting SAR in Indonesia by the TNI, Mobile Brigade Corps, and local Fire brigade units.

=== Ireland ===
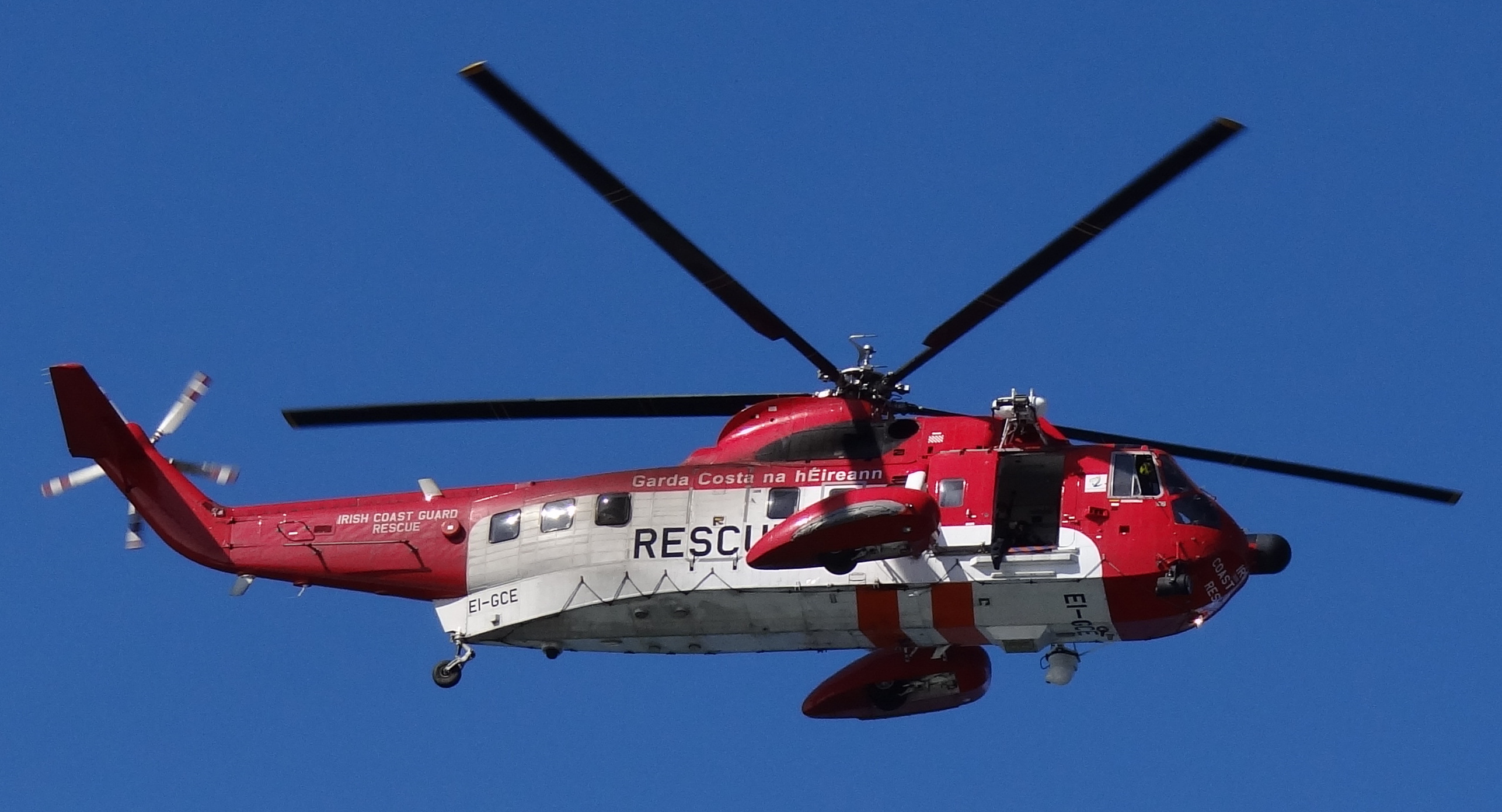
Irish Coast Guard Sikorsky S-61N SAR helicopter

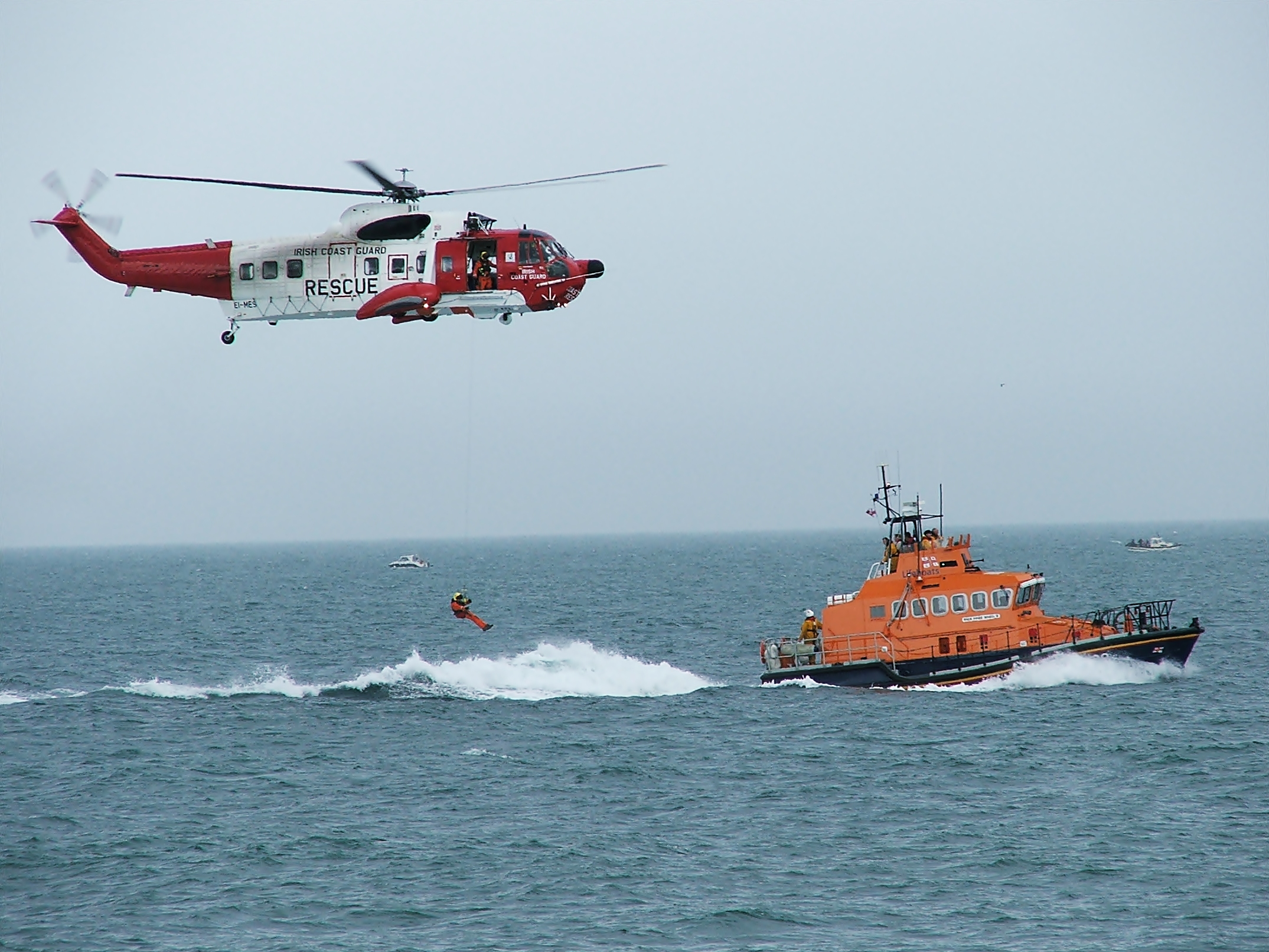
A search and rescue demonstration by an Irish Coast Guard Sikorsky S-61 helicopter and a RNLI lifeboat.

Maritime SAR services are provided by two civilian bodies – the Irish Coast Guard (IRCG) and the RNLI. The Coast Guard has responsibility for the Irish Search and Rescue Region. The Royal National Lifeboat Institution has 43 lifeboat stations including inland stations at Enniskillen and Lough Derg, the coastguard inshore rescue boats, and community rescue boats at fifteen stations: Ballinskelligs, County Kerry; Ballybunion, County Kerry; Ballyheigue, County Kerry; Banna, County Kerry; Bantry, County Cork; Bunmahon, County Waterford; Cahore, County Wexford; Carna, County Galway; Corrib/Mask Lakes, County Galway; Derrynane, County Kerry; Limerick City (River Shannon); Mallow Search and Rescue, County Cork; Schull, County Cork; Tramore, County Waterford; Waterford City River Rescue; Waterford Marine Search and Rescue. There are some 25 other independent rescue services.

Mountain Rescue in Ireland is provided by 12 voluntary teams based in different regions of the country.

The IRCG operate a number of contracted Sikorsky Search and Rescue helicopters from bases in Dublin, Waterford, Shannon and Sligo under the €500 million contract, from 2010, a previous fleet of Sikorsky S-61N helicopters were replaced with five newer Sikorsky S-92 helicopters. One of the new S-92 helicopters is located at each of the four IRCG bases, with one spare replacement aircraft being rotated between bases.

The Irish Coast Guard are launching a tender for a future SAR Aviation Contract, which is one of several tenders for similar services.

The Irish Air Corps provide top cover for search and rescue over land or sea and is available for maritime and mountain rescue if needed. The Irish Naval Service frequently assists the other agencies in search and rescue. Its patrol ships at sea and the communications centre at Haulbowline maintain a 24-hour watch on all distress frequencies.

Civil Defence Ireland also operates a range of land and inland water search and rescue services.

=== Israel ===
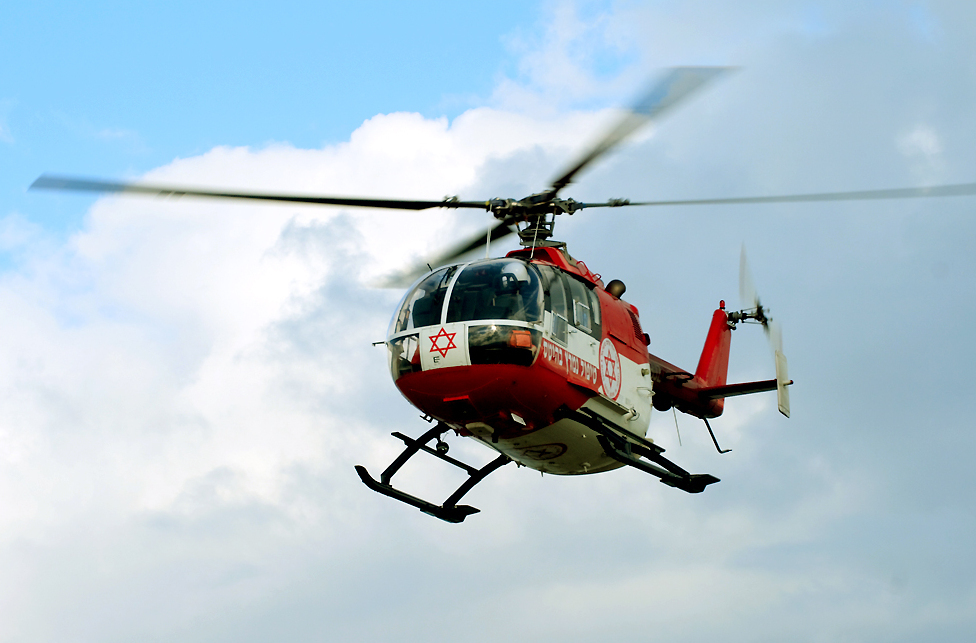
Helicopter of Magen David Adom

SAR in Israel is the responsibility of the IDF Home Front Command Search and Rescue (SAR). The unit was established at its current strength in 1984, combining all the specialist units that were involved with SAR until that time.

The SAR unit is a rapid mobilisation force and has an airborne transport and deployment capability for its personnel and equipment. The unit is composed of reserve personnel, with a regular cadre based at the Bahad 16 Unit training facility. With a focus on urban SAR, the unit operates specialised equipment, including a locally developed device for locating persons trapped under rubble by detecting seismic and acoustic emissions given off by the victims. The SAR unit also uses Search and rescue dogs specially trained to locate people buried under debris.

Israeli SAR resources

- Israel Defense Forces
  - Medical Corps (Israel)
  - Home Front Command
  - Bahad 16
  - Oketz Unit
- Israel Police
- IsraAid
- Magen David Adom
- ZAKA

=== Italy ===
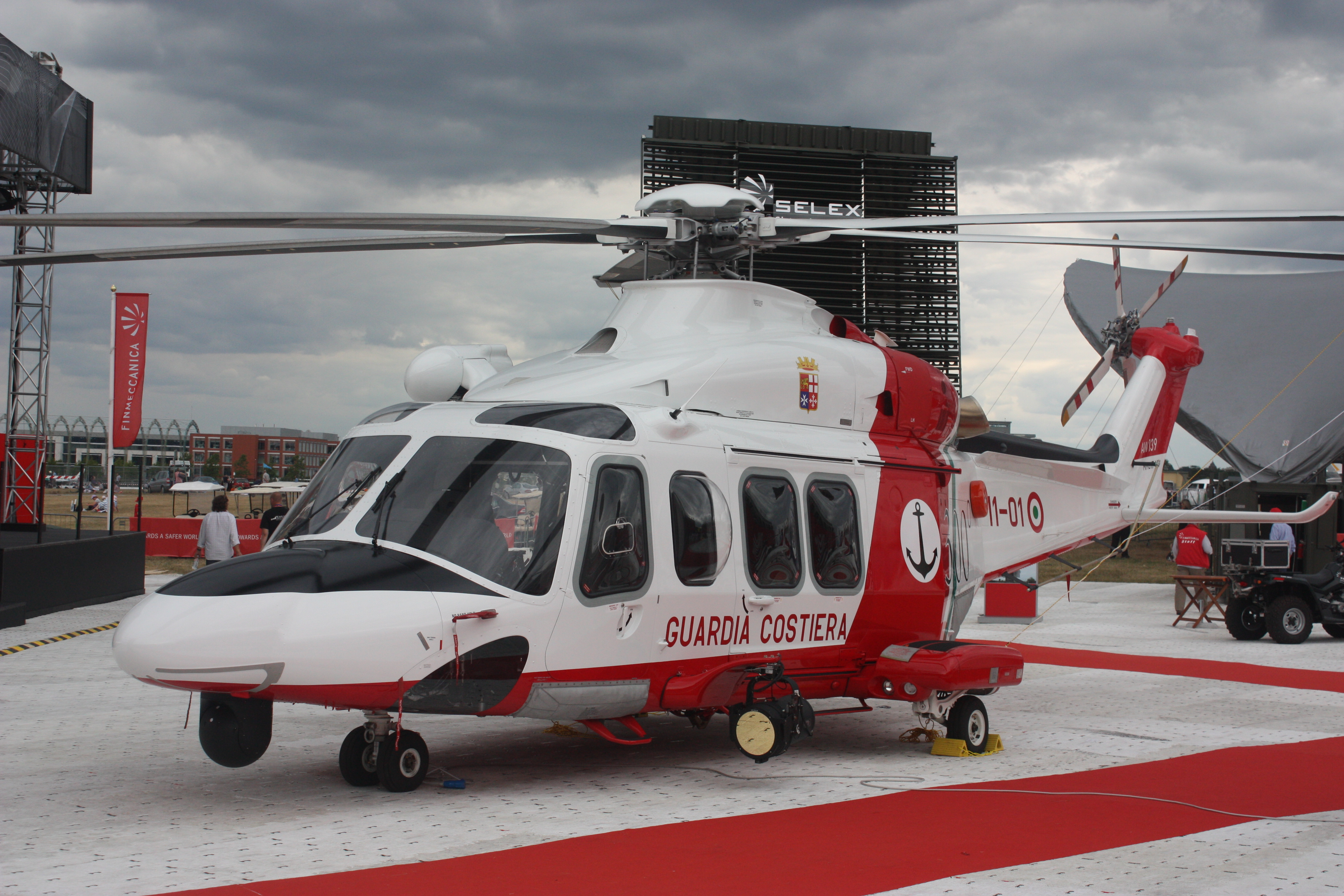
Italian AgustaWestland AW139 for sea rescue.

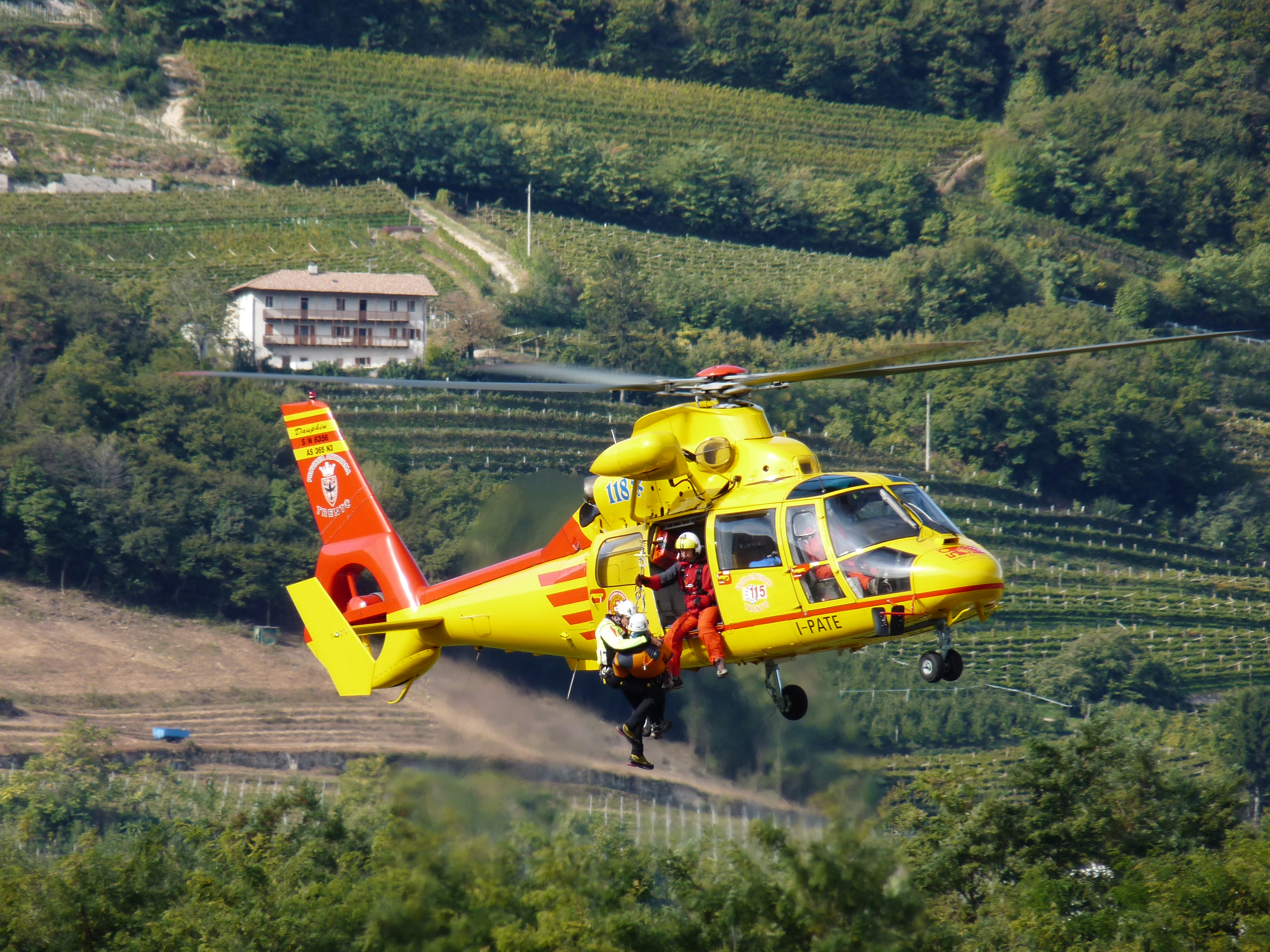
Italian AS365 Dauphin rescue helicopter

Italian SAR operations are carried out by the Guardia Costiera, backed up by naval aviation and the air force, including Aeronautica Militare Comando 15° Stormo (15th Wing), the Italian Red Cross, and other organisations.

=== Jordan ===
Jordan's Civil Defense Urban Search and Rescue team (USAR) has achieved the UN classification as a heavy USAR team. The team's role mainly earthquake rescue.

=== Kenya ===
The Kenya Maritime Authority and the Kenya Civil Aviation Authority are responsible for Aeronautical SAR within Kenya's waterways and aerospace respectively.

=== Macau ===
Macau's maritime SAR is conducted by two units:

The Macau Marine Department and responsible for maritime SAR within Macau's waterways. The Macau Search and Rescue Coordination Centre is under the Vessel Traffic Control Centre of Macao of the Maritime Administration of Macau.

=== Malaysia ===
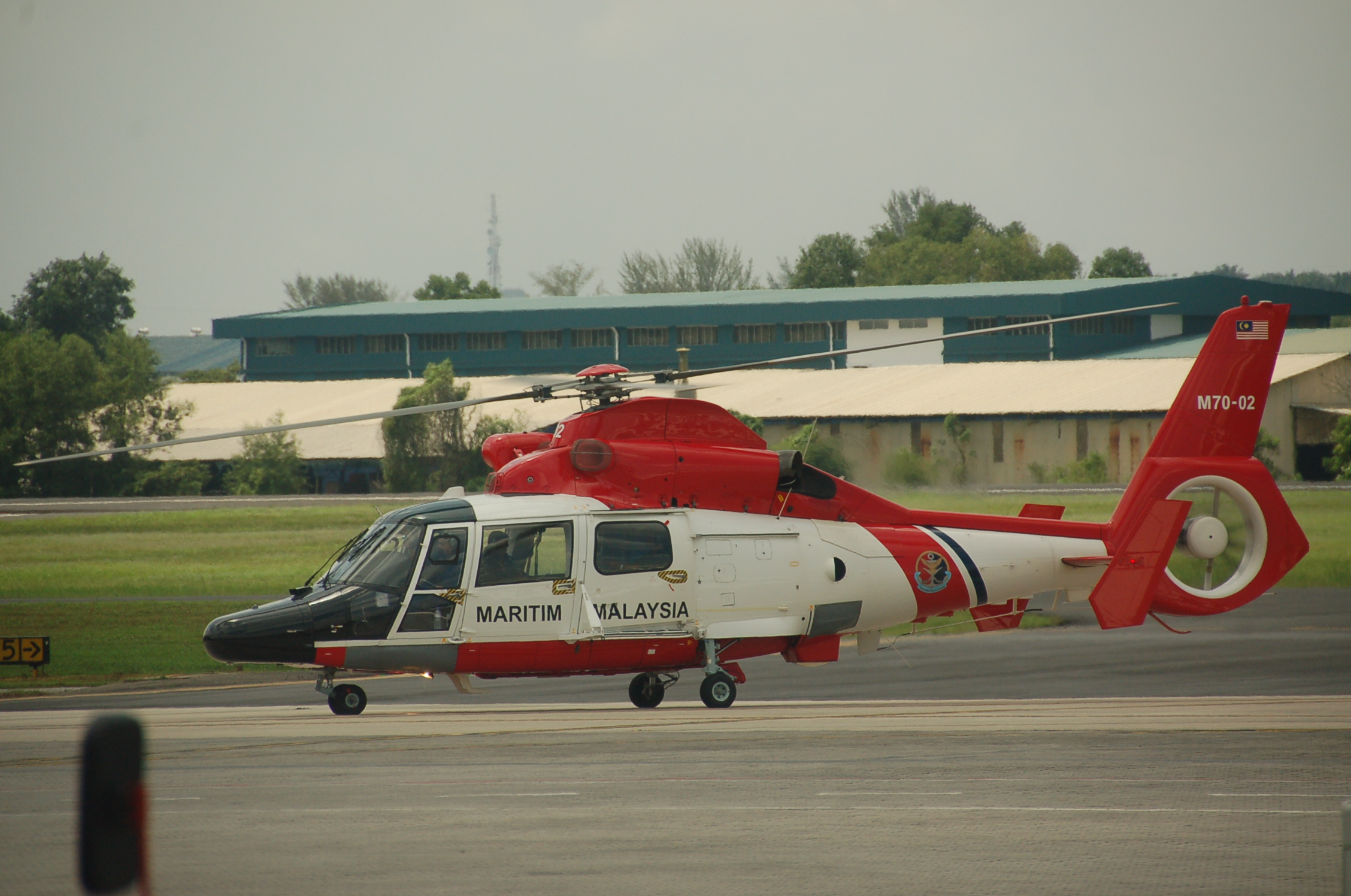
MMEA's Eurocopter AS365 N3 Dauphin used for SAR and surveillance.

For land rescue, Malaysia has two primary SAR units: the Special Malaysia Disaster Assistance and Rescue Team (SMART), which reports to the National Security Council, and the Malaysian Fire and Rescue Department's (FRDM) Special Tactical Operation and Rescue Team of Malaysia (STORM) unit. They are sometimes aided by the jungle experts, the aboriginal police unit named Senoi Praaq, Royal Malaysian Police (RMP) VAT 69 Commando, the Malaysian Armed Forces' special operations force, and the Malaysian Civil Defence Force. Both SMART and STORM, as with other FRDM's special operations, often participate in international SAR missions.

For maritime SAR, it is the responsibility of Malaysia Coast Guard and FRDM, along with support from the RMP's Marine Operations Force and the Royal Malaysian Air Force's PASKAU.

=== Malta ===
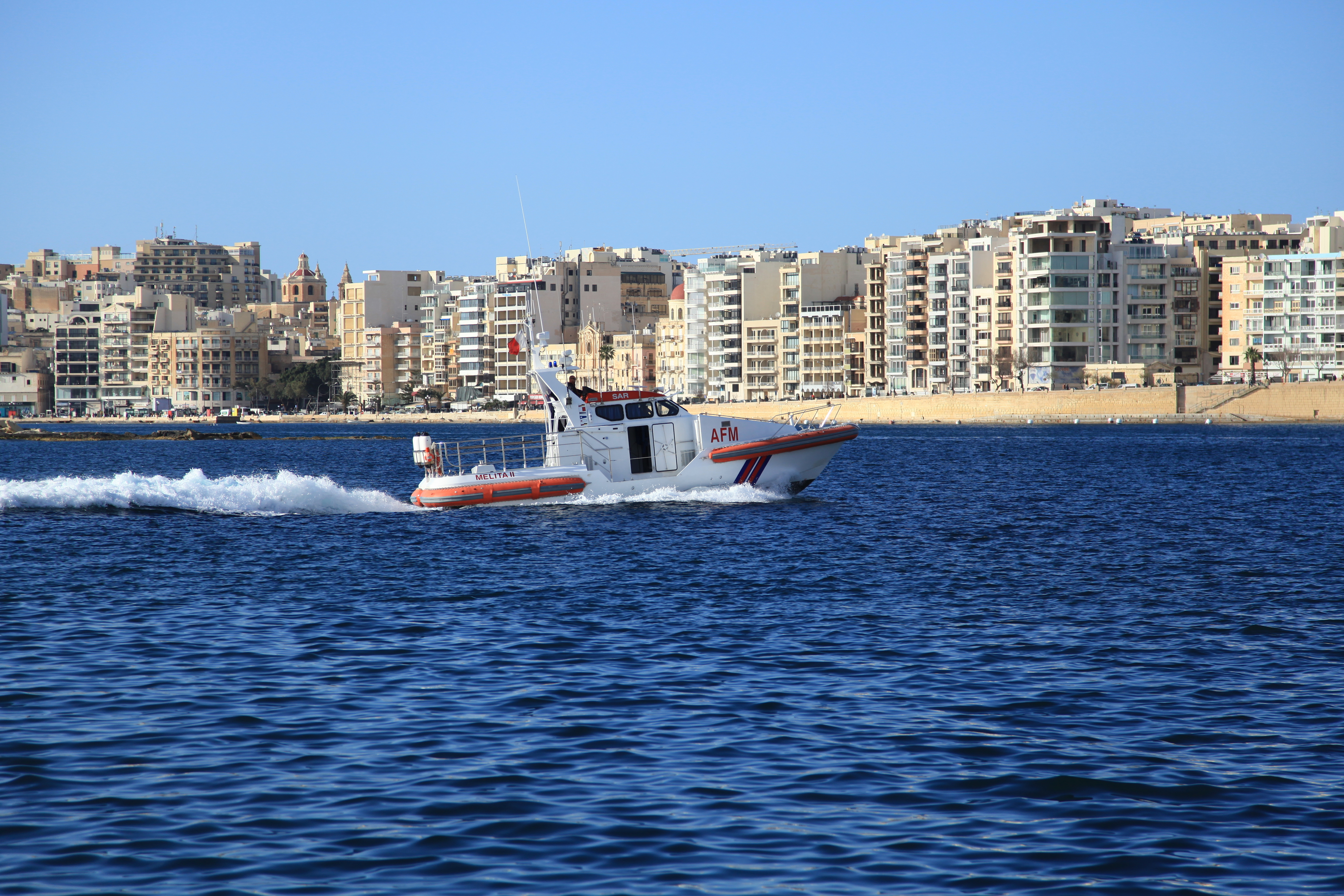
The AFM's search and rescue launches Melita I and Melita II have been used for search and rescue operations since 1999.

The responsibility for SAR at sea in the Malta Search and Rescue Region falls under the Armed Forces of Malta (AFM). It is carried out by maritime patrol aircraft, helicopters and vessels under the co-ordination, command and control of the Rescue Co-ordination Centre.

The AFM, in close collaboration with the US Coast Guard, also runs a Search and Rescue Training Centre for International Students in Maritime SAR Mission Co-ordination and Planning. To date more than 30 foreign students from 15 countries including Albania, Cameroon, Croatia, Equatorial Guinea and Kenya have attended these courses.

Malta is also in talks with Libya about enhancing SAR cooperation between the two countries.

=== Netherlands ===
SAR responsibility in the Netherlands is held by the Netherlands Coastguard, carried out by vessels and aircraft from various organisations among which mostly the Royal Netherlands Sea Rescue Institution, the Dutch Lifeguard Association, the Ministry of Transport and Water Management and the Ministry of Defence (Netherlands).

=== New Zealand ===
New Zealand's Search and Rescue Region extends from the South Pole to the southern border of the Honolulu region, including Norfolk, Tonga, Samoa, and Cook Islands.

Smaller searches known as Category one searches are controlled by the New Zealand Police Search and Rescue, who call on LandSAR and often the Police Dog Section for land-based operations, such as for lost hikers known as tramping in New Zealand, police also call on the Royal New Zealand Coastguard for coastal maritime incidents within 12 nautical miles of the shore. Larger maritime search and rescue events known as Category two searches, such as searches for emergency beacons, reports of overdue aircraft, etc, fall under the control of the Rescue Coordination Centre New Zealand (RCCNZ), based in Avalon, which coordinates response from local coastguard, helicopter operators, merchant marine, air force and naval resources.

Urban Search and Rescue falls primarily within the domain of the Fire and Emergency New Zealand, particularly the three USAR Taskforce groups based in Palmerston North, Christchurch, and Auckland. These teams draw together numerous specialists and organisations to achieve an integrated multi-agency response.

Among those organisations that act in a support capacity for FENZ are Response Teams (NZRTs). These are regional rescue groups of professional volunteers that train to a minimum industry standard of USAR Category 1R (USAR Responder), which is also standard for FENZ firefighters. Response Teams are registered with the Ministry of Civil Defence and Emergency Management (MCDEM), and assist their local MCDEM Groups and communities in emergencies to supplement full-time emergency services. Their additional capabilities, which vary among different teams, include: high angle rope rescue, storm response, swift water response, medics, welfare, and rural fire support. Many Response Teams were deployed to assist in the rescue and recovery effort of the 2011 Christchurch earthquake.

Other resources:

- Westpac Rescue Helicopter (New Zealand) – charitable organisation
- Life Flight (New Zealand) – charitable organisation
- New Zealand Land SAR Search Dogs – the official NZ search dogs group providing land search & rescue services under NZ Land SAR, wilderness and avalanche rescue dogs.

=== Norway ===
On a national level and on sea, two agencies maintain the responsibility of leading search and rescue missions: the Joint Rescue Coordination Centre of Southern Norway and the Joint Rescue Coordination Centre of Northern Norway.

In case of local search and rescue missions, particularly on land and usually missing person cases, each of Norway's police districts are responsible of leading search and rescue missions on behalf of the Joint Rescue Coordination Centres. The police can call in both civilian, military and voluntary units with various and specialised competencies for carrying out the search and rescue mission, such as:

Professionals:

- Norwegian Civil Defence
- Norwegian Home Guard
- No. 330 Squadron of the Royal Norwegian Air Force
- Police Helicopter Service
- Norwegian Air Ambulance Service
- Norwegian Society for Sea Rescue (larger rescue crafts operated by a professional crew)

Volunteers:

- Norwegian Red Cross Search and Rescue Corps
- Norwegian People's Aid
- Norwegian Search and Rescue Dogs
- Norwegian Society for Sea Rescue (smaller rescue crafts operated by a voluntary crew)
- Norwegian Radio Relay League
- Norwegian Speleological Society
- Norwegian Scouts' Emergency Response Teams
- Norwegian Air Sports Federation's Air Service

All voluntary organisations associated with search and rescue in Norway that are recognised by the JRCC's and the police, are members of the Voluntary Organizations' Rescue Forum (Frivillige Organisasjoners Redningsfaglige Forum; FORF). Although the voluntary organisations are represented on a national level, the organisations actually carrying out the missions are usually independent on district and local levels.

Depending on each local organisation's needs and budgets, the voluntary organisations may have specialised equipment for carrying out missions effectively, such as boats, all-terrain vehicles, snowmobiles, ambulances, and quadcopters with thermal cameras. Depending on geography and other local circumstances, the local voluntary organisations tend to course their volunteers in fields that are relevant to the local and surrounding areas. Some local voluntary organisations have blue emergency lights and sirens on their vehicles, though orange and white lights without sirens are more common.

The No. 330 Squadron of the Royal Norwegian Air Force is the only dedicated search and rescue unit operated by the Norwegian government. The squadron operates a total of 16 AgustaWestland AW101, codenamed SAR Queen. Until 2023, the RNoAF used 16 Westland Sea Kings. There have been issues with phasing in the SAR Queen, due to landing sites across the country not being sized for the increased downwash.

All organisations, either professional or voluntary, have access to the Public Safety Network.

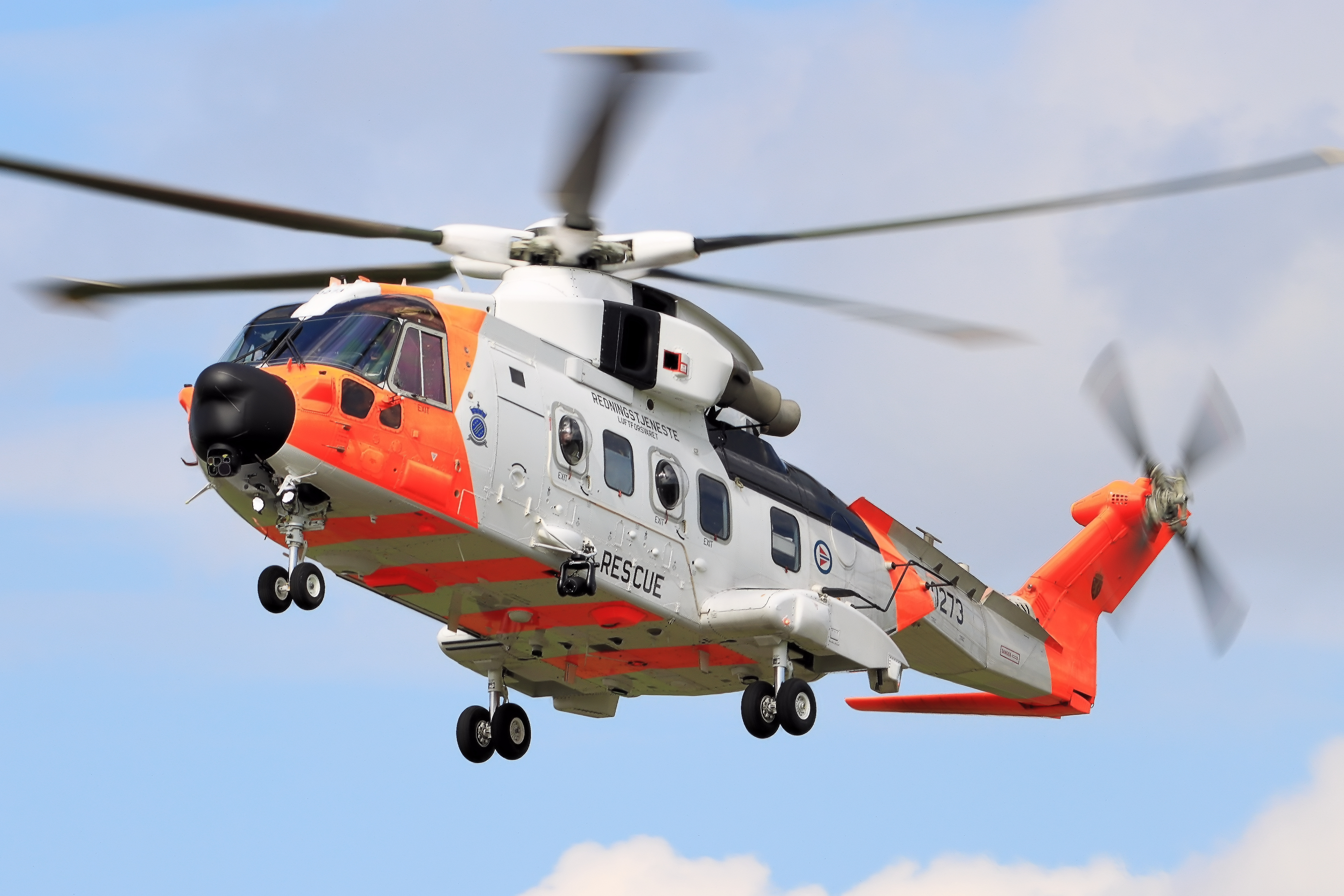
The SAR Queen, Norway's dedicated SAR helicopter

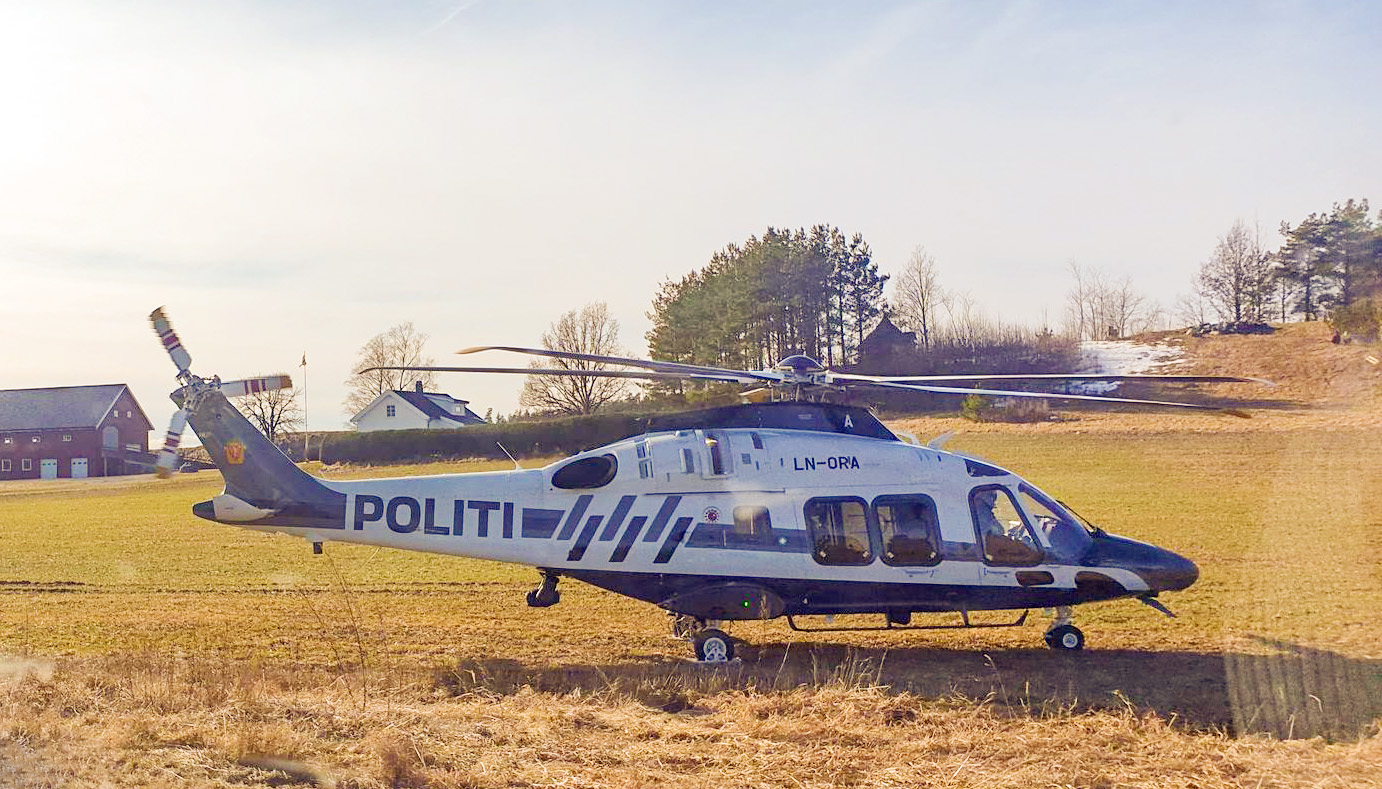
The police helicopters are also used in SAR missions, particularly around the Greater Oslo Region

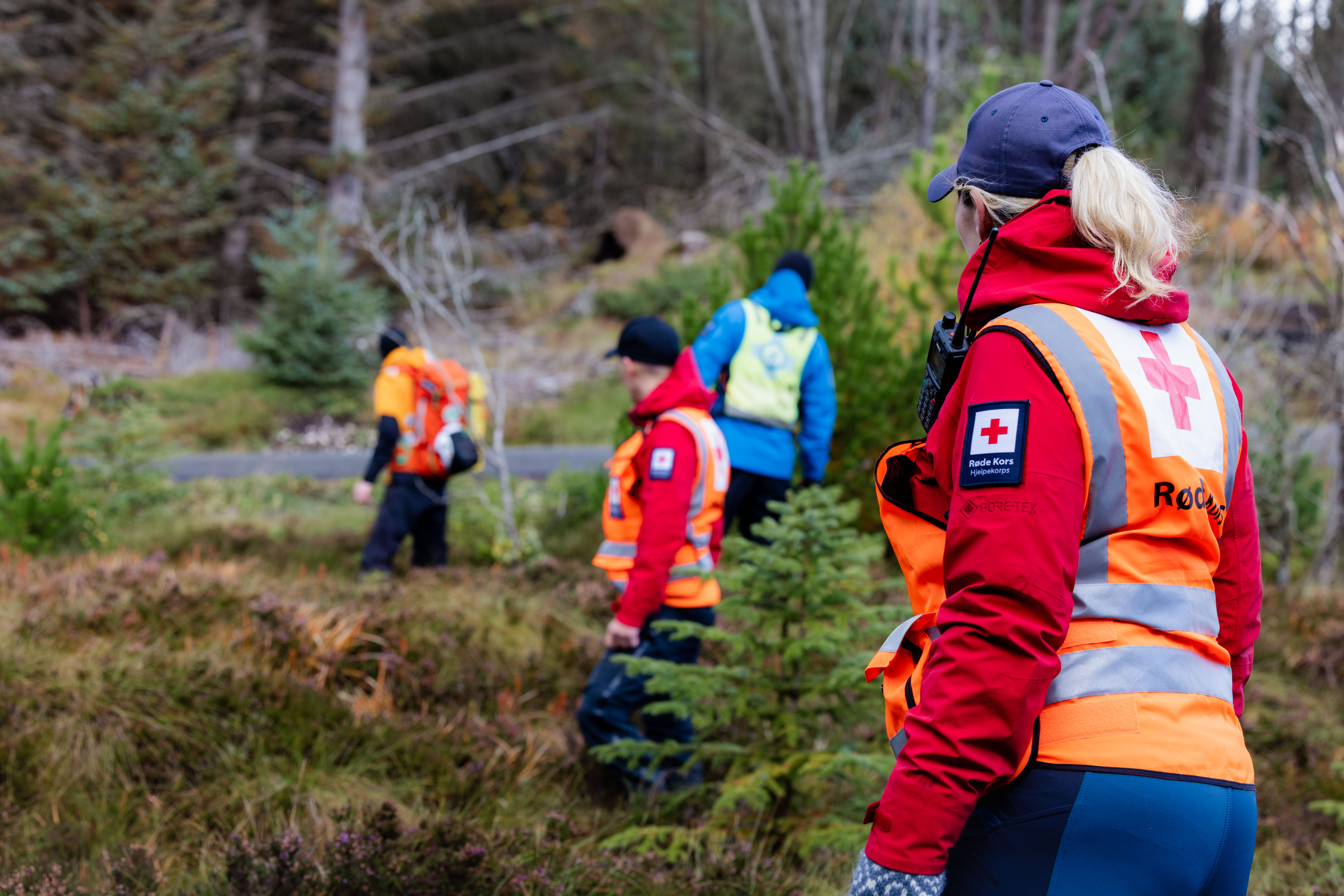
Various volunteers from the Red Cross, People's Aid and Rescue Dogs

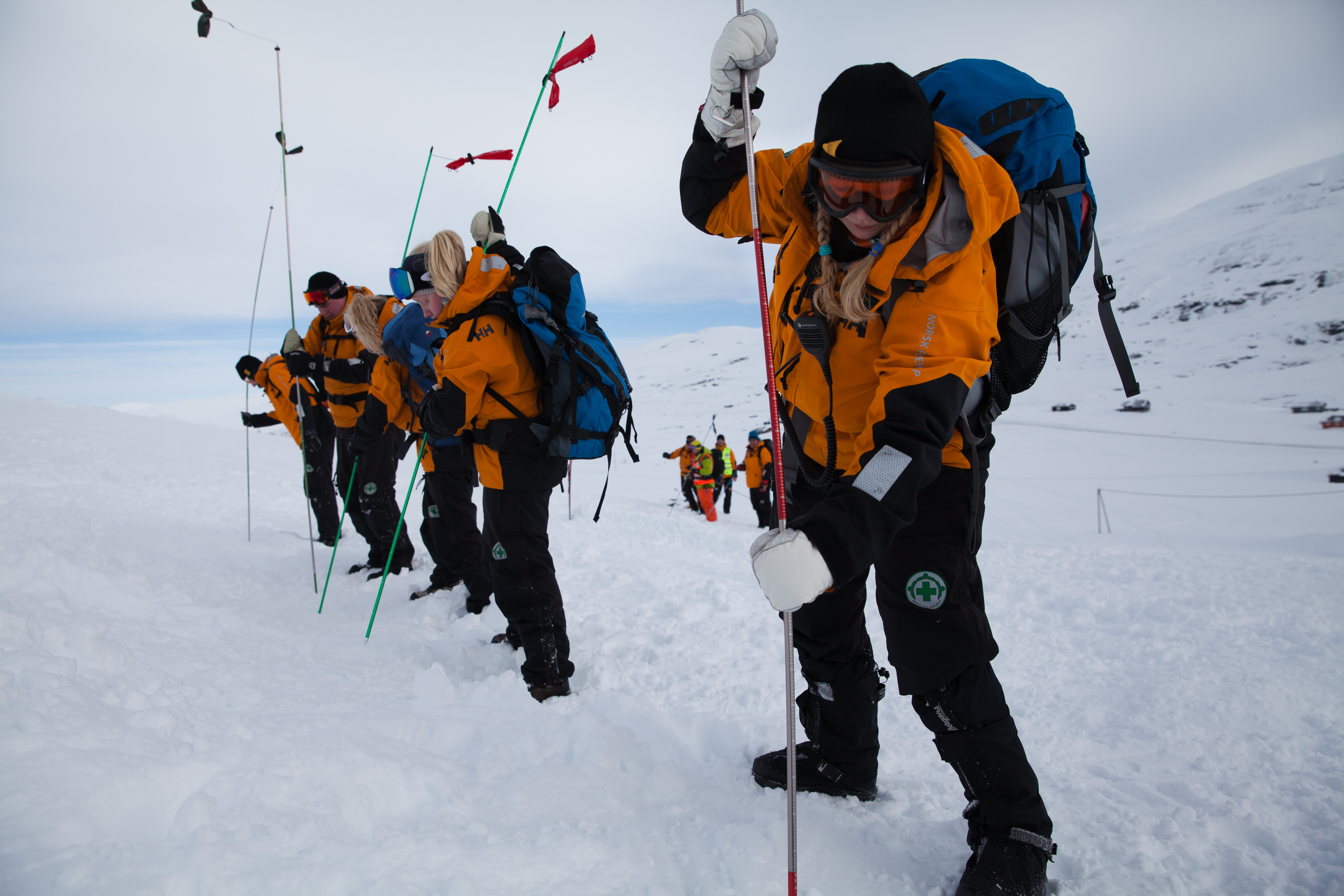
Norwegian People's Aid volunteers participating in a course, here specialising in avalanche search and rescue

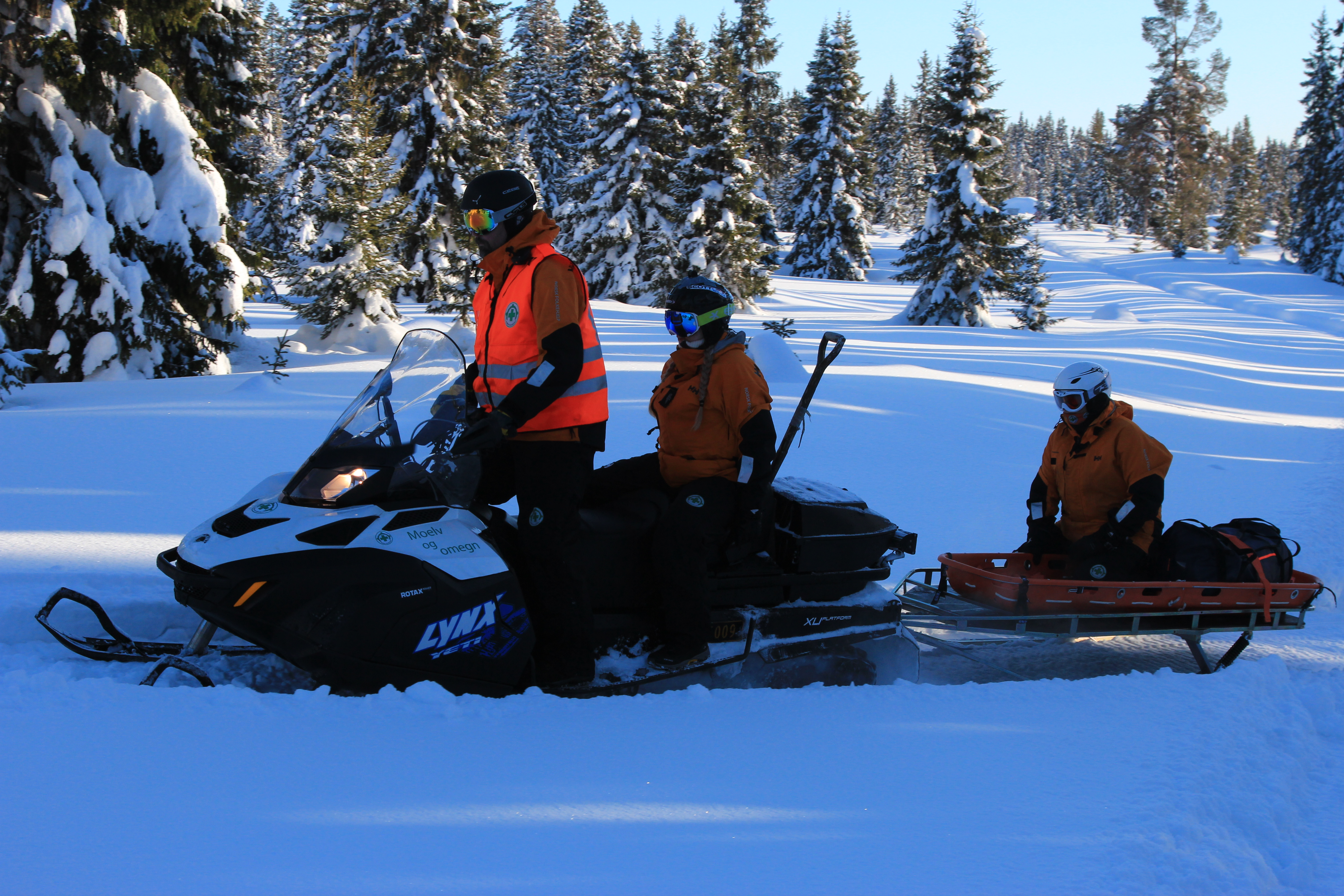
A snowmobile from Norwegian People's Aid

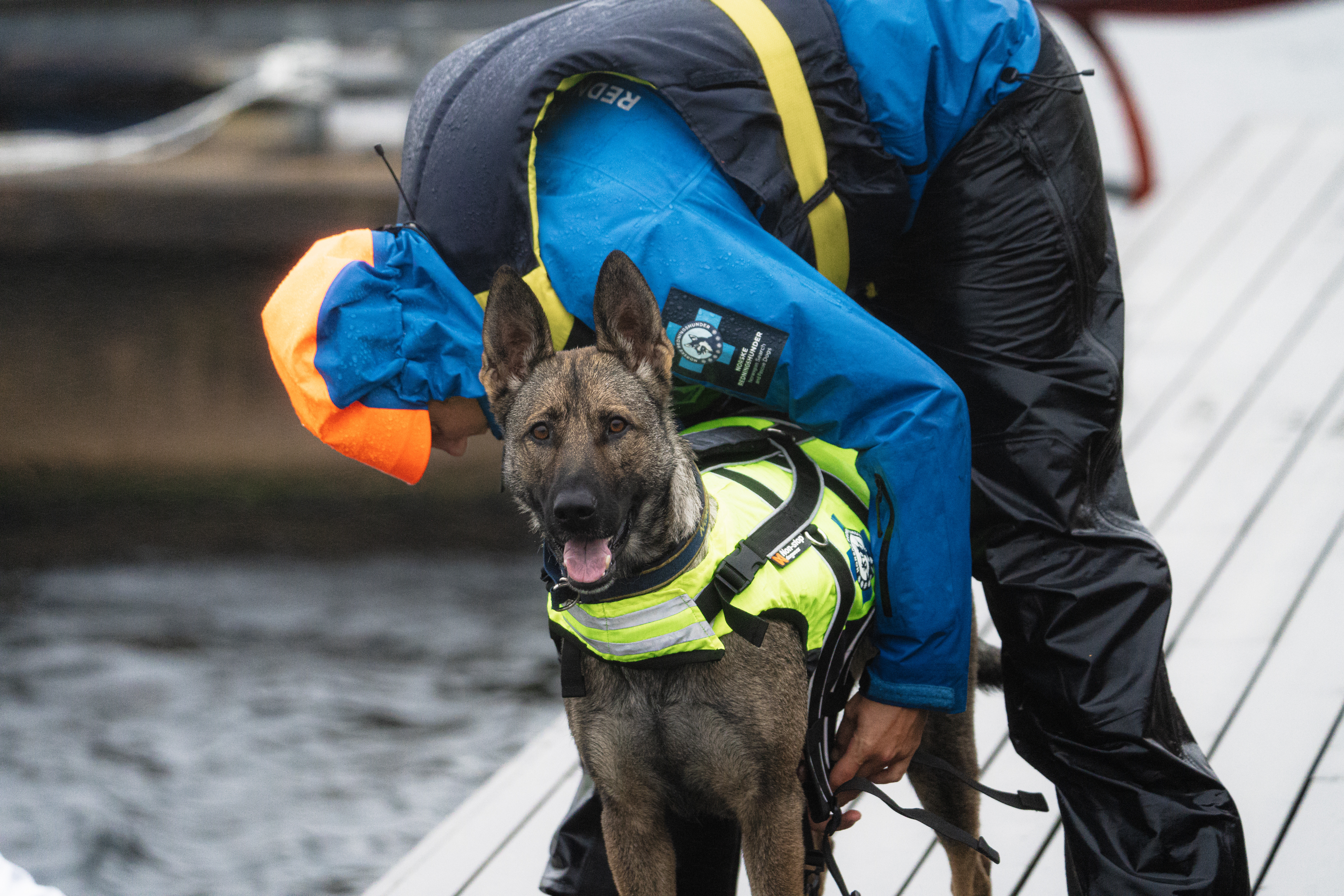
A dog from Norwegian Search and Rescue Dogs

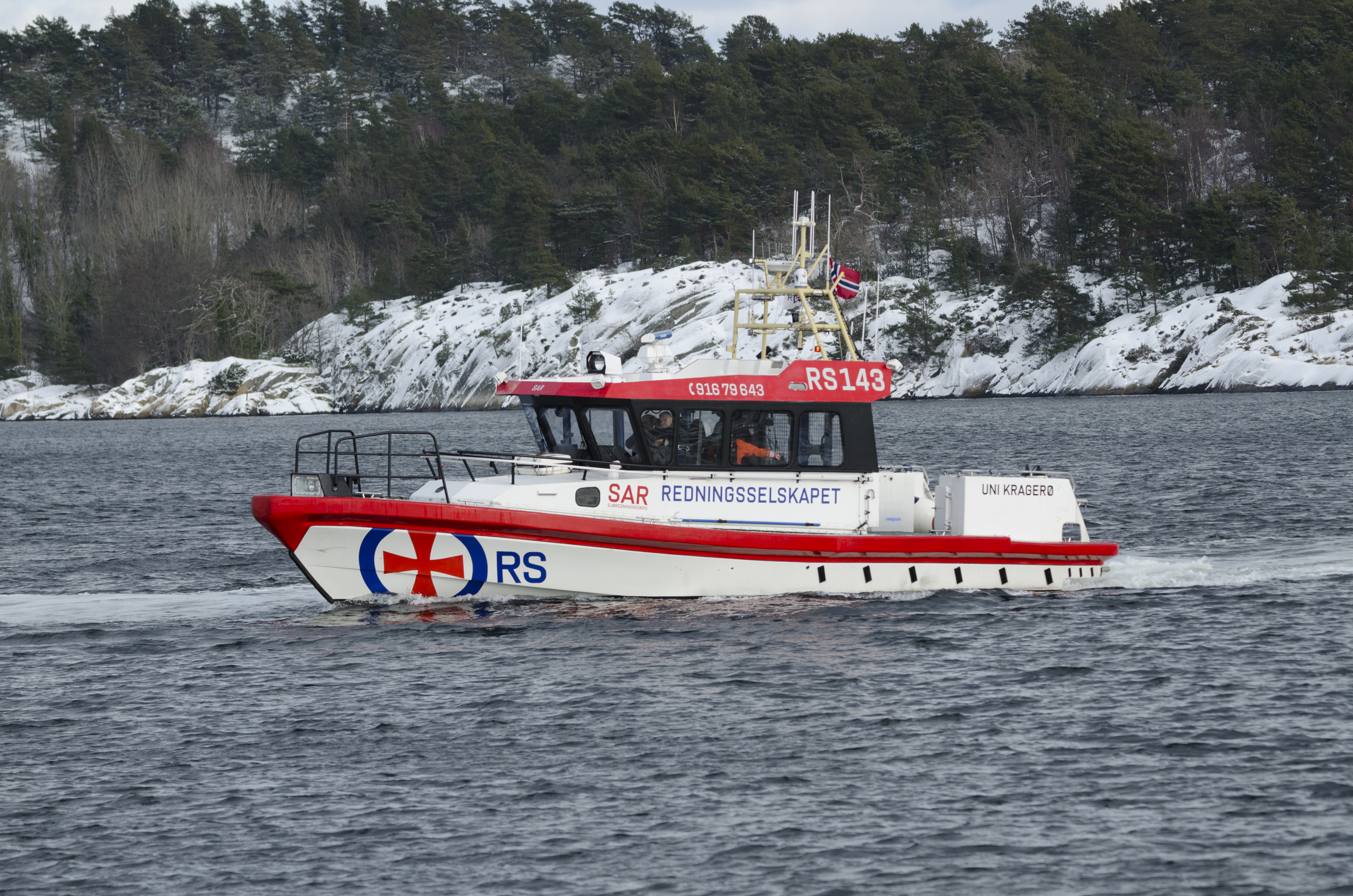
RS Uni Kragerø, operated by a voluntary crew

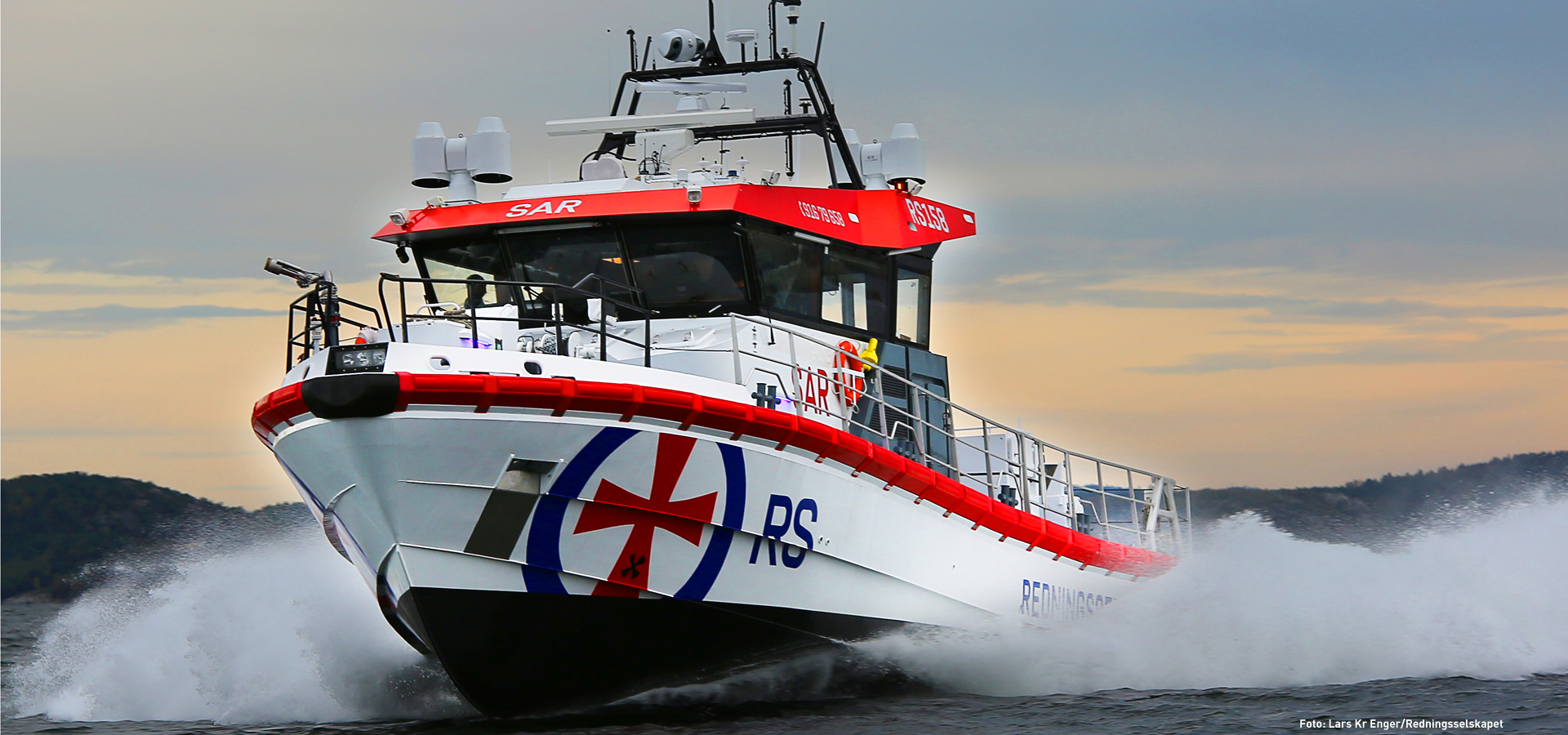
RS Idar Ulstein, operated by a professional crew

=== Philippines ===
The agencies responsible for Search and Rescue activities in the Philippines are:

- Office of Civil Defense
- National Disaster Risk Reduction and Management Council
- Philippine Air Force
- Philippine Army
- Philippine Coast Guard
- Bureau of Fire Protection

=== Portugal ===
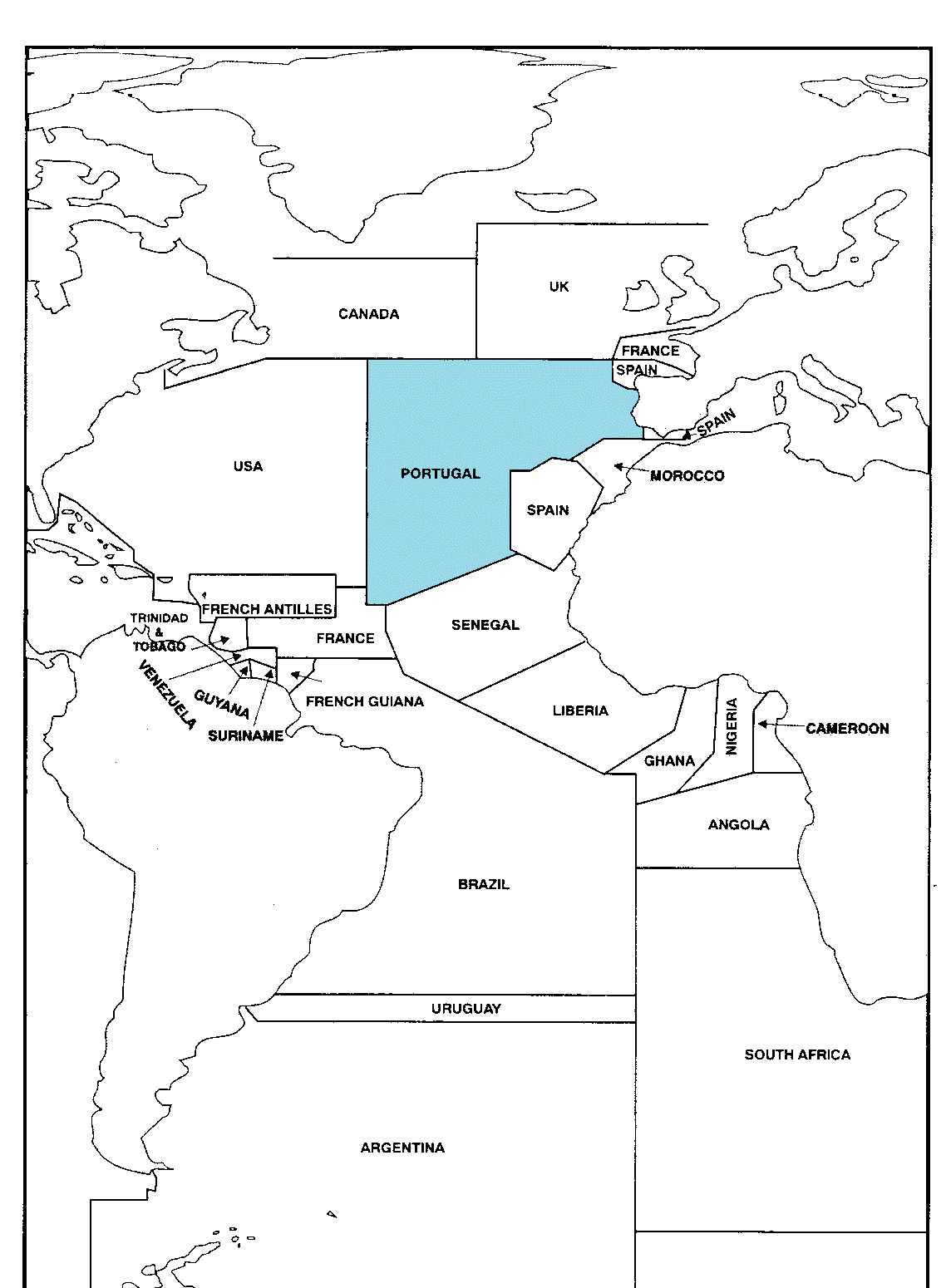
Portuguese Search and Rescue Area

Three different agencies are responsible for providing search and rescue in Portugal. The Portuguese Navy is responsible for all sea rescues, the Portuguese Air Force for all the rescues originating within the airspace, including aircraft crashes and the Autoridade Nacional de Protecção Civil (ANPC) for all inland rescues. All of the above coordinate closely with each other providing a comprehensive search and rescue service.

The Portuguese area of responsibility comprises the Lisbon and Santa Maria Flight Information Regions (FIR).

=== Poland ===
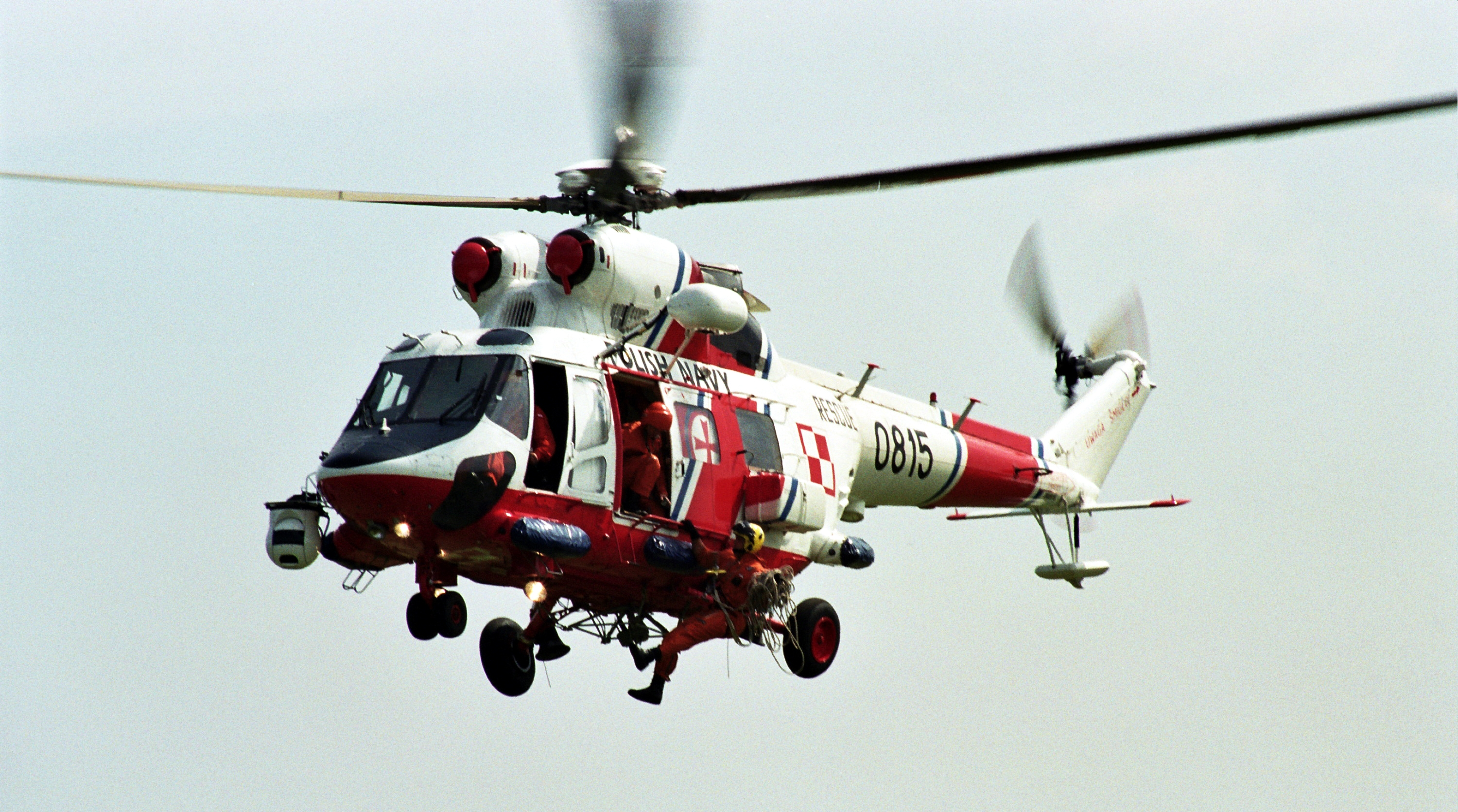
A Polish Navy W-3 Sokół SAR helicopter hoists a crew member

In Poland most search and rescue operations are undertaken by the airborne units of the Polish Armed Forces. The Navy currently has the largest SAR fleet of helicopters and also operates a number of small vessels for the purpose of rescuing crewmen of stricken ships. There is also, however a semi-governmental organisation known as the 'Morska Służba Poszukiwania i Ratownictwa' (Maritime Search and Rescue Service) which provides the vast majority of seaborne services to vessels in distress; the service is currently (as of 2010) in the process of overhauling and replacing a large portion of its fleet of lifeboats.

Other civilian search and rescue units in Poland include:

- Górskie Ochotnicze Pogotowie Ratunkowe, GOPR (Mountain Volunteer Search and Rescue)
- Tatrzańskie Ochotnicze Pogotowie Ratunkowe, TOPR (Tatra Mountains Volunteer Search and Rescue)
- Wodne Ochotnicze Pogotowie Ratunkowe, WOPR (Water Volunteer Search and Rescue) – operating on inland and coastal waters

=== South Africa ===
Search and Rescue services are offered by various government departments, non governmental organisations, commercial/private organisations and voluntary organisations in South Africa. There is no single organisation responsible for urban, wilderness, swift water, aviation or maritime/sea rescue.

Aviation and maritime incidents are the responsibility of the South African Search and Rescue Organisation (SASAR). SASAR is a voluntary organisation that functions under the auspices of the Department of Transport. Its main role is to search for, assist and carry out rescue operations for the survivors of aircraft or vessel accidents. Depending on the nature of the accident, the RCCs (Aeronatautical Rescue Coordination Centre (ARCC) or Maritime Rescue Coordination Centre (MRCC)) coordinate the search and rescue missions. These operations are carried out by other government departments, non governmental organisations, commercial/private organisations and voluntary organisations.

Local resources:

- National Sea Rescue Institute
- Wilderness Search and Rescue Cape Town
- The Mountain Club of South Africa Search and Rescue
- Search and Rescue South Africa
- Rescue South Africa
- K9 Search and Rescue
- Metro Search and Rescue

=== Spain ===
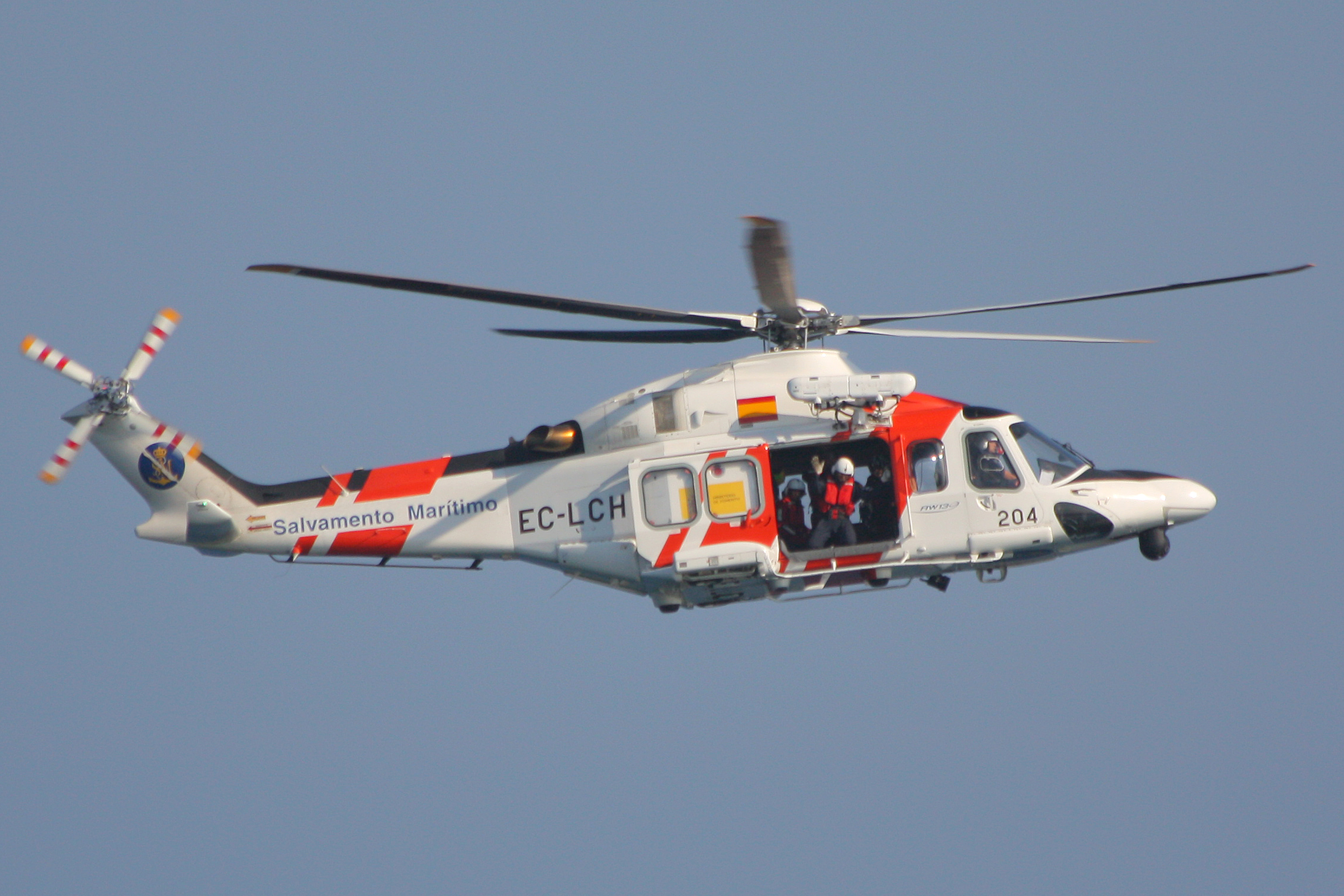
Sociedad de Salvamento y Seguridad Maritima AgustaWestland AW139 SAR helicopter

Search and rescue duties in Spain are the responsibility of the national government, in conjunction with regional and municipal governments. The Sociedad de Salvamento y Seguridad Marítima is the main organisation, and has overall responsibility for the maritime search and rescue, that also coordinates the SAR efforts with other agencies:

- Spanish Navy
- Spanish Air and Space Force
- Servicio de Vigilancia Aduanera
- Servicio Marítimo de la Guardia Civil

=== Sweden ===
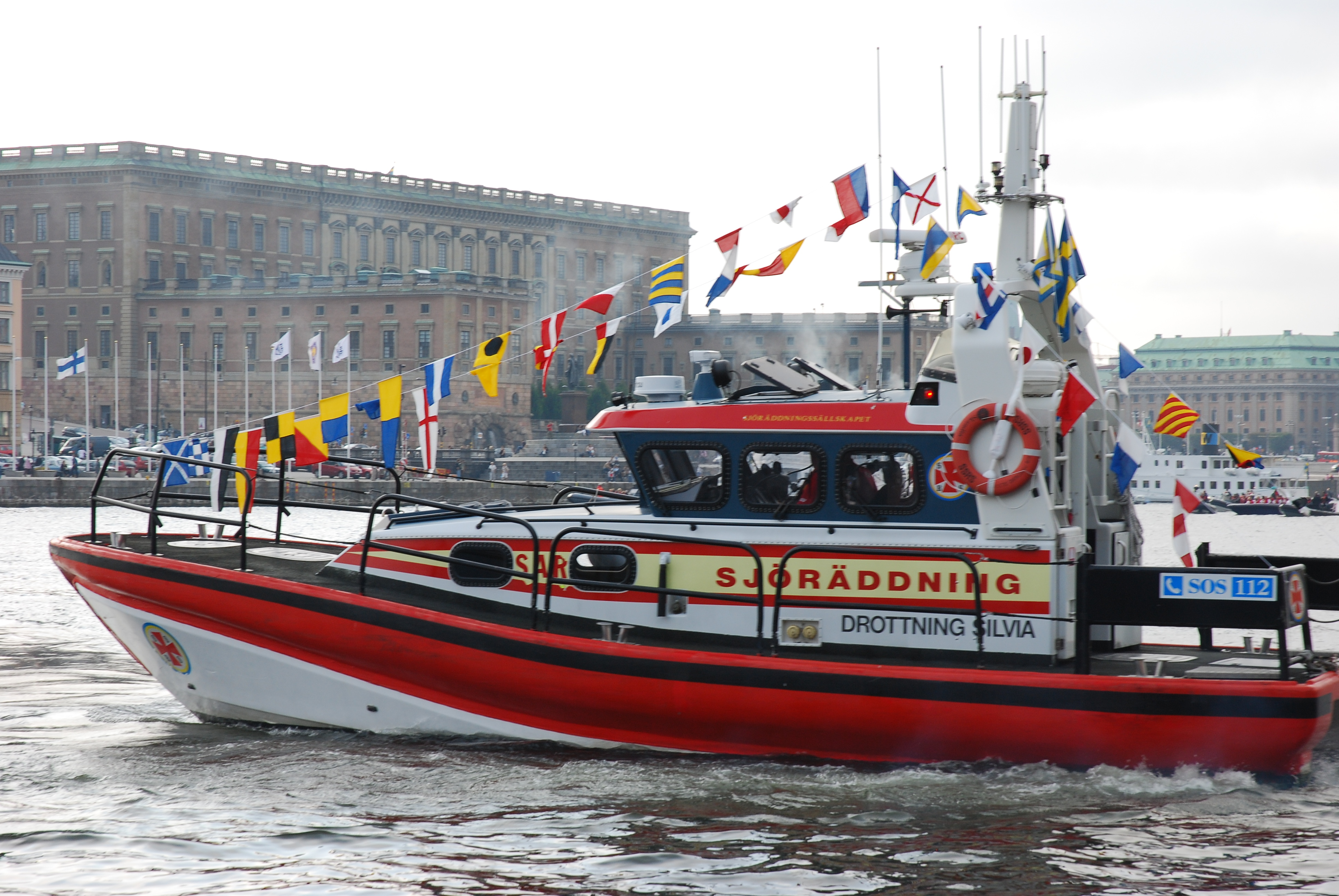
Swedish rescue vessel Drottning Silvia (Queen Silvia) in front of the Royal Castle in Stockholm, Sweden

The Swedish Maritime Administration is responsible for maritime SAR in Swedish waters, and operate seven AgustaWestland AW139 SAR helicopters from five bases along the coast of Sweden. Together with the Swedish Sea Rescue Society and the Swedish Coast Guard they are carrying out Sar in Swedish waters. The Coast guard has 31 larger Ships and 3 De Havilland Canada Dash 8 aeroplanes for SAR. The Swedish Sea Rescue Society is an organisation aiming at saving lives and recovering property at sea. The society operates 68 search and rescue stations and some 185 ships crewed by 2100 volunteers, of those more than 300 are on call at any time, and can respond within 15 minutes. In 2011, the volunteers turned out to an emergency 3274 times. The Swedish Sea Rescue Society is involved 70% of the number SAR missions in Swedish waters.

=== Switzerland ===
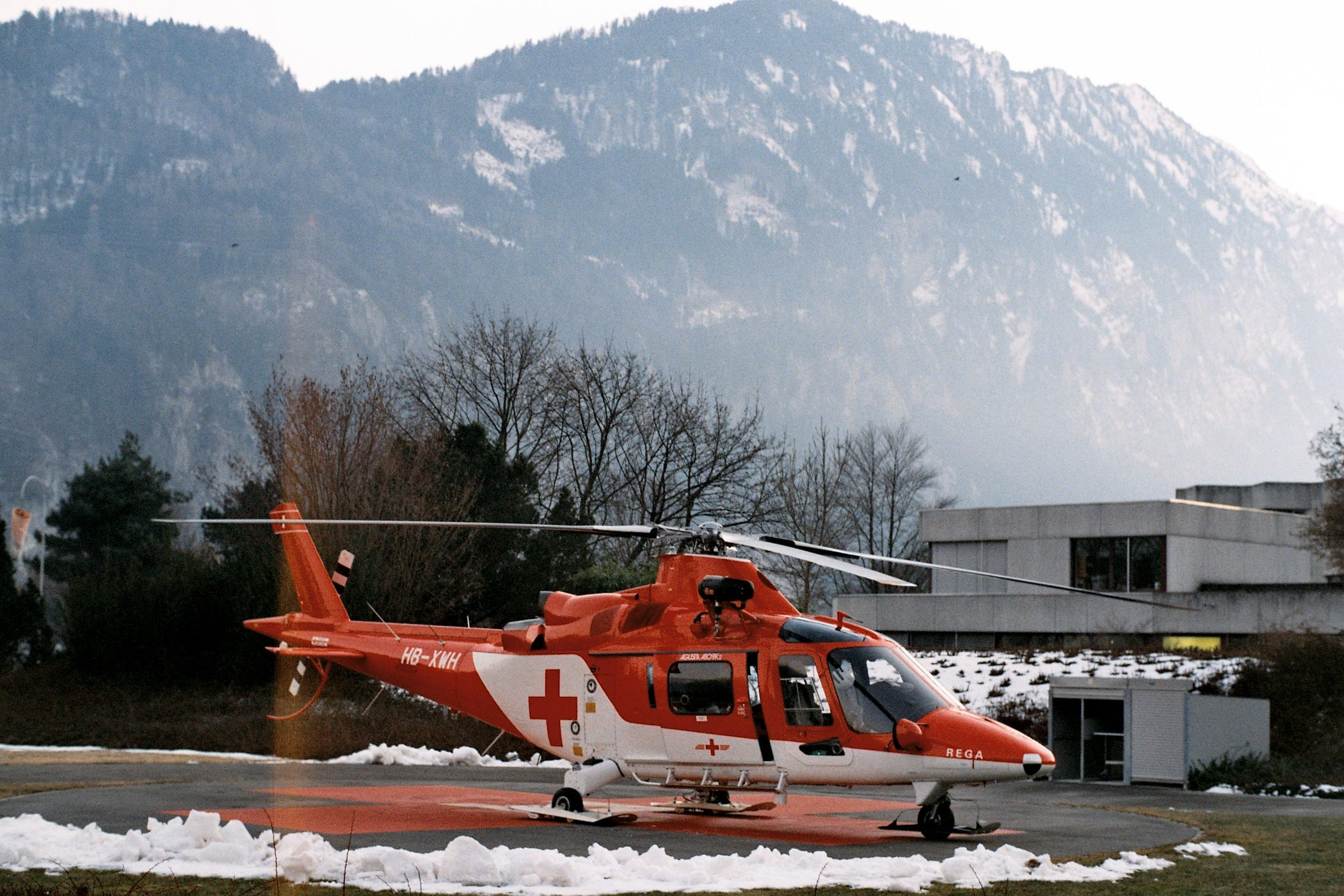
REGA Agusta A109 K2.

REGA (Schweizerische REttungsflugwacht / Garde Aérienne / Guardia Aerea) is the air rescue service which provides emergency medical assistance in Switzerland, notably in mountains but also in cases of life-threatening emergencies elsewhere. They will also return a citizen to Switzerland from a foreign country if they are in need of urgent medical care. Rega was established on 27 April 1952 by Dr. Rudolf Bucher, who thought that the Swiss rescue organisation needed a specialised air sub-section.

=== Taiwan ===
National Airborne Service Corps (NASC; Chinese: 內政部空中勤務總隊; pinyin: Nèizhèngbù Kōngzhōng Qínwù Zǒngduì) is the agency of the Ministry of the Interior of the Republic of China responsible for executing and providing support for search and rescue, disaster relief, emergency medical service, transportation, monitoring, reconnaissance and patrol in Taiwan.

Coast Guard Administration (CGA; Chinese: 行政院海岸巡防署; pinyin: Xíngzhèngyuàn Hǎi'àn Xúnfáng Shǔ) is charged with maintaining coastal waters and the pelagic zone patrols, smuggling and stowaway crackdowns, maritime rescues, natural resource conservation, and public services. The CGA is considered a civilian law enforcement agency under the administration of the Executive Yuan, though during emergencies it may be incorporated as part of the Republic of China Armed Forces.

=== Turkey ===
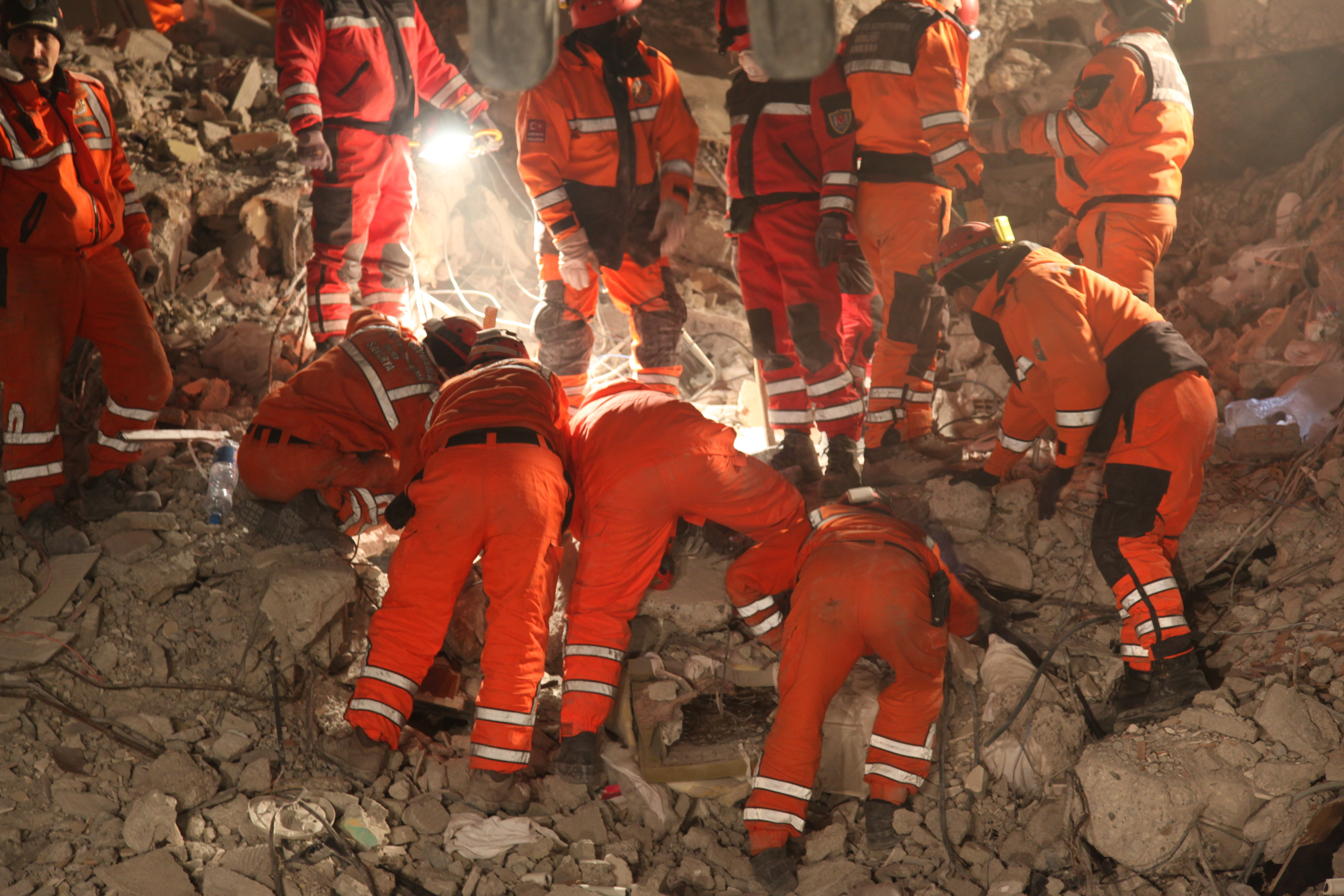
Disaster and Emergency Management Presidency (AFAD) teams in search and rescue mission 2011 Van earthquakes.

Search and Rescue operators in Turkey are primarily:

Civil governmental and non-governmental organisations

- Disaster and Emergency Management Presidency; also known as AFAD
- AKUT Search and Rescue Association
- National Medical Rescue Team (UMKE)
- ANDA
- GEA Search and Rescue Association is a group of search and rescue, ecology and social campaigners, founded in 1994, made up of volunteer members.
- AKDF Search and Rescue Associations Federation was established in nineteen different districts.
- AKA
- Search and Rescue and Emergency Aid Association (AKAY)
- AKUT
- Middle East Search and Rescue, Mountaineering and Outdoor Sports Association (ORDOS)
- NAK
- National Emergency Search and Rescue Association (NESAR)

Military

- Gendarmerie Search and Rescue Battalion Command (JAK)
- Gendarmerie Underwater Search and Rescue Teams (SAK)
- Diving, Safety, Security, Search and Rescue Team
- Air Force Search and Rescue
- Coast Guard Command (Turkey) Turkish Coast Guard is also the main Search and Rescue Coordination Authority in Turkish SAR Zone

=== Ukraine ===
In Ukraine search and rescue is conducted by the State Search and Rescue Aviation Service of the Ministry of Emergencies of Ukraine Ukraviaposhuk.

=== United Kingdom ===
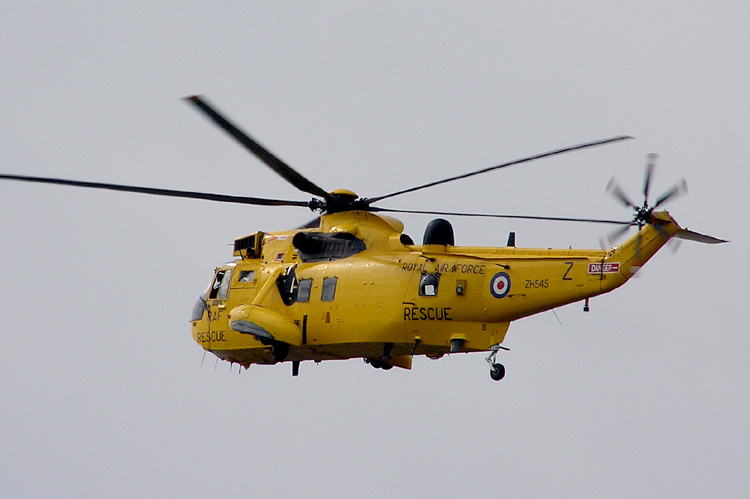
Royal Air Force Westland Sea King

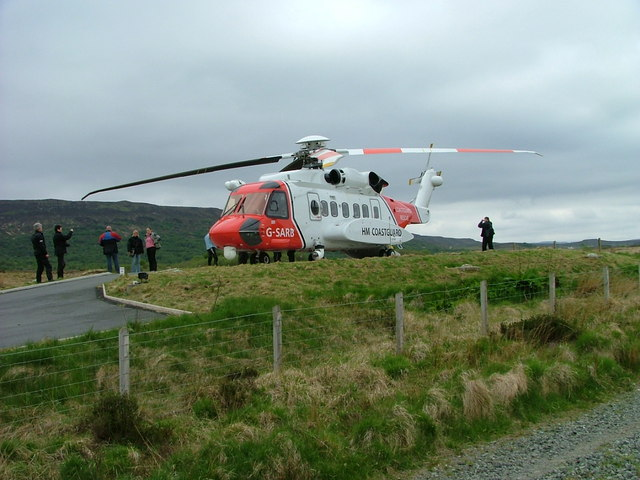
HM Coastguard Sikorsky S-92 SAR helicopter

In the UK, land-based searches for a missing person are usually coordinated by the local police. There is a network of local volunteer agencies that can be called out to assist these searches, which are part of the Association of Lowland Search And Rescue. Other voluntary agencies exist to provide specialist search and rescue services, such as the Cave Rescue Organisation and Mountain Rescue Committee of Scotland. These organisations are usually called out indirectly by the police. For example, the British Cave Rescue Council advises that if someone goes missing in a cave, callers should contact the local police who will then summon cave rescue. Urban search and rescue units are run by the fire services.

His Majesty's Coastguard are in charge of maritime search and rescue missions. The Coastguard is one of the four emergency services that can be contacted on 999. Their role is to initiate and coordinate the searches. Lifeboats are provided by volunteer agencies, often by the Royal National Lifeboat Institution, but also by many Independent Lifeboats. Aircraft for an air-sea rescue were originally provided by the Royal Navy and Royal Air Force. Under the programme UK-SAR, they are now operated under contract by Bristow Helicopters. The Maritime & Coastguard Agency are launching a tender for their second generation UK search and rescue aviation programme (UKSAR2G), which is one of several tenders for similar services.

Examples of local resources include:

- Berkshire Lowland Search and Rescue
- Cardiff and Vale Rescue Association
- Cave Rescue Organisation
- Emergency Response Team Search and Rescue
- Mercia Inshore Search and Rescue
- Scarborough and Ryedale Mountain Rescue Team
- Surrey Search and Rescue
- Severn Area Rescue Association
- Upper Wharfedale Fell Rescue Association
- West Mercia Search and Rescue

=== United States ===
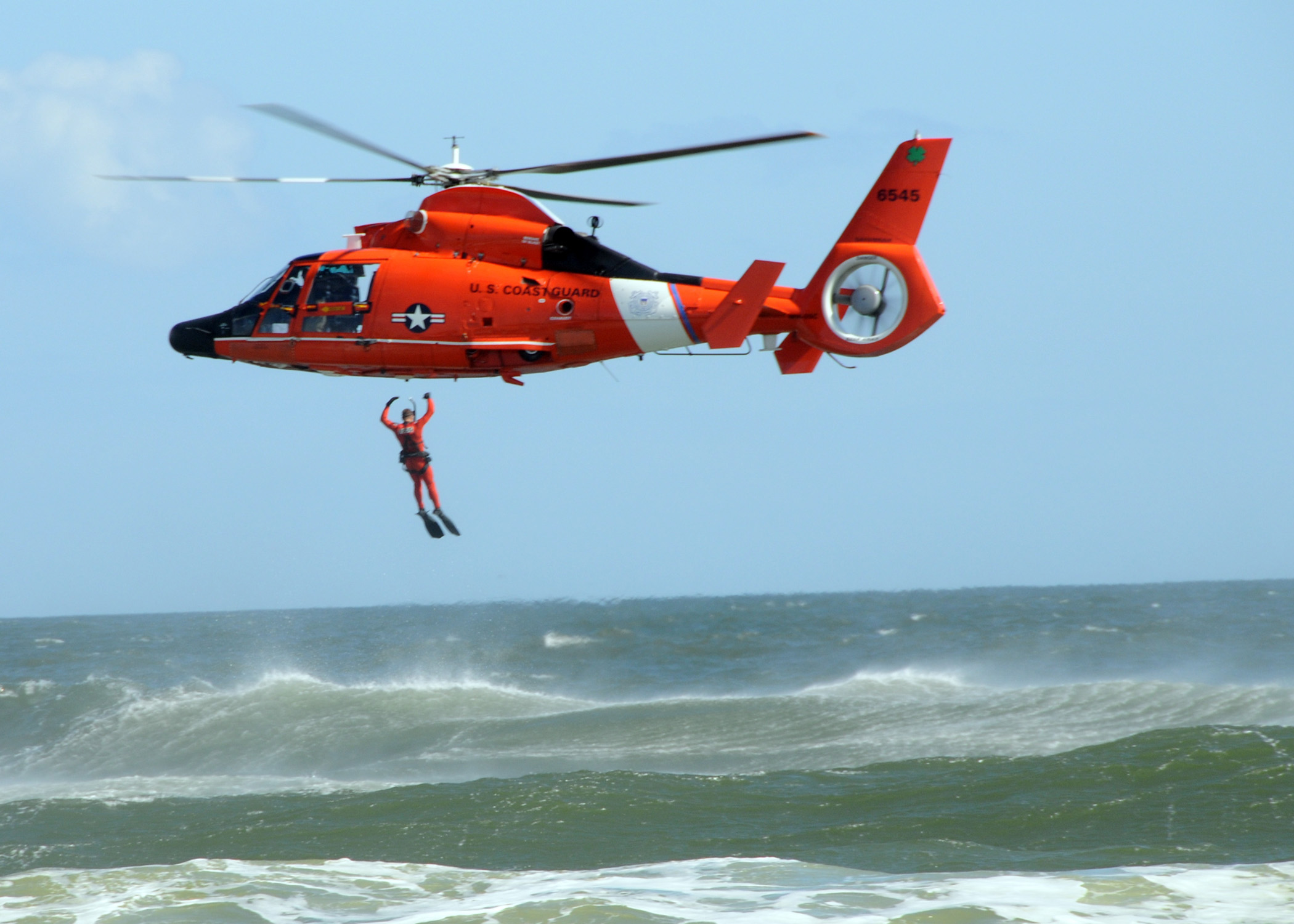
US Coast Guard Eurocopter HH-65 Dolphin SAR helicopter

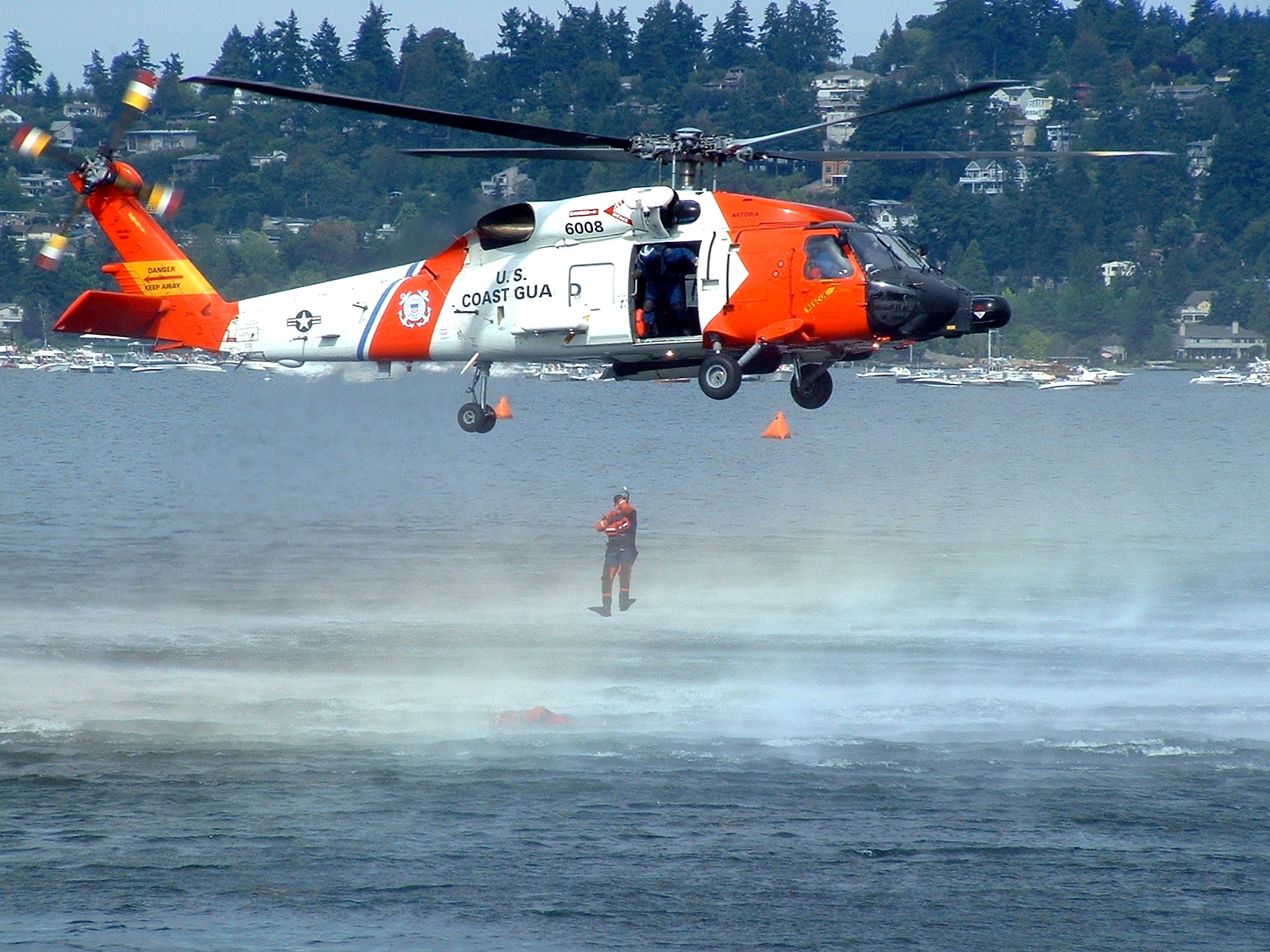
US Coast Guard Sikorsky HH-60 Jayhawk SAR helicopter

In the United States there are many organisations with SAR responsibilities at the national, state and local level. Most day-to-day SAR missions in the US are run by the County Sheriffs, except in states like Alaska, where the State Highway Patrol oversees SAR, or in other areas where SAR services are part of fire/rescue, EMS, or a wholly separate, non-profit organisation. They in turn, can request help from other departments, as well as state and national resources if they think they need them. A typical Sheriff's Office has a volunteer SAR team that matches the terrain and population of that county. SAR members are typically trained in the Incident Command System (ICS), first aid, and the outdoor skills needed in that terrain and climate. Most of this article is about the federal response to assist large complicated SAR missions.

In January 2008, the United States Department of Homeland Security (DHS) released the National Response Framework which serves as the guiding document for a federal response during a national emergency. Search and Rescue is divided into four primary elements, while assigning a federal agency with the lead role for each of the four elements.

- Structural Collapse-USAR: Department of Homeland Security Federal Emergency Management Agency
- Waterborne: United States Coast Guard, United States Coast Guard Auxiliary
- Inland-wilderness: United States Department of Interior, National Park Service
- Aeronautical: United States Air Force via the Air Force Rescue Coordination Center and USAF rescue wings, groups and squadrons in the Air Combat Command, Pacific Air Forces (for Alaska and Hawaii), Air Education and Training Command, Air Force Reserve Command and the Air National Guard; the Civil Air Patrol in its role as the USAF Auxiliary; and the United States Navy and United States Marine Corps, both Active and Reserve (secondary missions for land-based USN maritime patrol and reconnaissance squadrons and land-based and sea-based USN/USMC helicopter squadrons)

SAR standards adopted by agencies having jurisdiction are developed primarily by non-governmental organisations, including ASTM International and National Fire Protection Association. These standards are adopted also by training and certification organisations such as Mountain Rescue Association and National Association for Search and Rescue to develop training that will meet or exceed those standards. Within ASTM International, standards specific to SAR are developed by Technical Committee F32 on Search and Rescue. Formed in 1988, the committee had 85 current members and jurisdiction of 38 approved standards.

=== Vietnam ===
Under command of the Central Government:

- National Committee of Search and Rescue is responsible for searching, rescuing and disaster relief.
- Central Committee of Prevention of Natural Disasters is responsible for analysing information and monitoring disaster relief processes.

Under command of local People's Committee:

- Each province and municipality has a Provincial or City Committee of Prevention of Natural Disaster

Under command of the Ministry of Defense:

- General Staff: Department of Rescue of Vietnam People's Army is responsible for coordinating all military rescue activities (including ground force rescue activities).
- Navy: Office of Rescue of Vietnam People's Navy is responsible for coordinating naval rescue activities.
- Air Force: Office of Rescue of Vietnam People's Air Force is responsible for coordinating air force rescue activities.
- Coast Guard: Office of Rescue of Vietnam Coast Guard is responsible for coordinating coastal rescue activities.
- Border Guard: Office of Rescue of Vietnam Border Defense Force is responsible for coordinating border rescue activities.

Under command of the Ministry of Public Security:

- Vietnam Fire and Rescue Police Department is responsible for fire fighting activities.

Under command of the Ministry of Transport:

- Department of Maritime Administration: Vietnam Maritime Search and Rescue Coordination Center (VMRCC) is responsible for maritime rescue activities. VMRCC is divided into 4 Rescue Regions:
  - Vietnam Maritime Search and Rescue Coordination Center of Region I: operate in Tonkin Gulf
  - Vietnam Maritime Search and Rescue Coordination Center of Region II: operate in North Central sea
  - Vietnam Maritime Search and Rescue Coordination Center of Region III: operate in Gulf of Thailand and Southern sea
  - Vietnam Maritime Search and Rescue Coordination Center of Region IV: operate in South Central sea
- Corporation of Air Traffic Management: Vietnam Aviation Search and Rescue Coordination Center (VARCC) is responsible for air rescue activities. VARCC is divided into 3 Rescue Regions:
  - Vietnam Aviation Search and Rescue Coordination Center of Northern Vietnam: operate in Northern region
  - Vietnam Aviation Search and Rescue Coordination Center of Central Vietnam: operate in Central region
  - Vietnam Aviation Search and Rescue Coordination Center of Southern Vietnam: operate in Southern region
  - Vietnam Railway Rescue and Natural Calamity Response Center of Northern Vietnam: operates in Northern region
  - Vietnam Railway Rescue and Natural Calamity Response Center of Central Vietnam: operates in Central region
  - Vietnam Railway Rescue and Natural Calamity Response Center of Southern Vietnam: operates in Southern region

== Aircraft ==
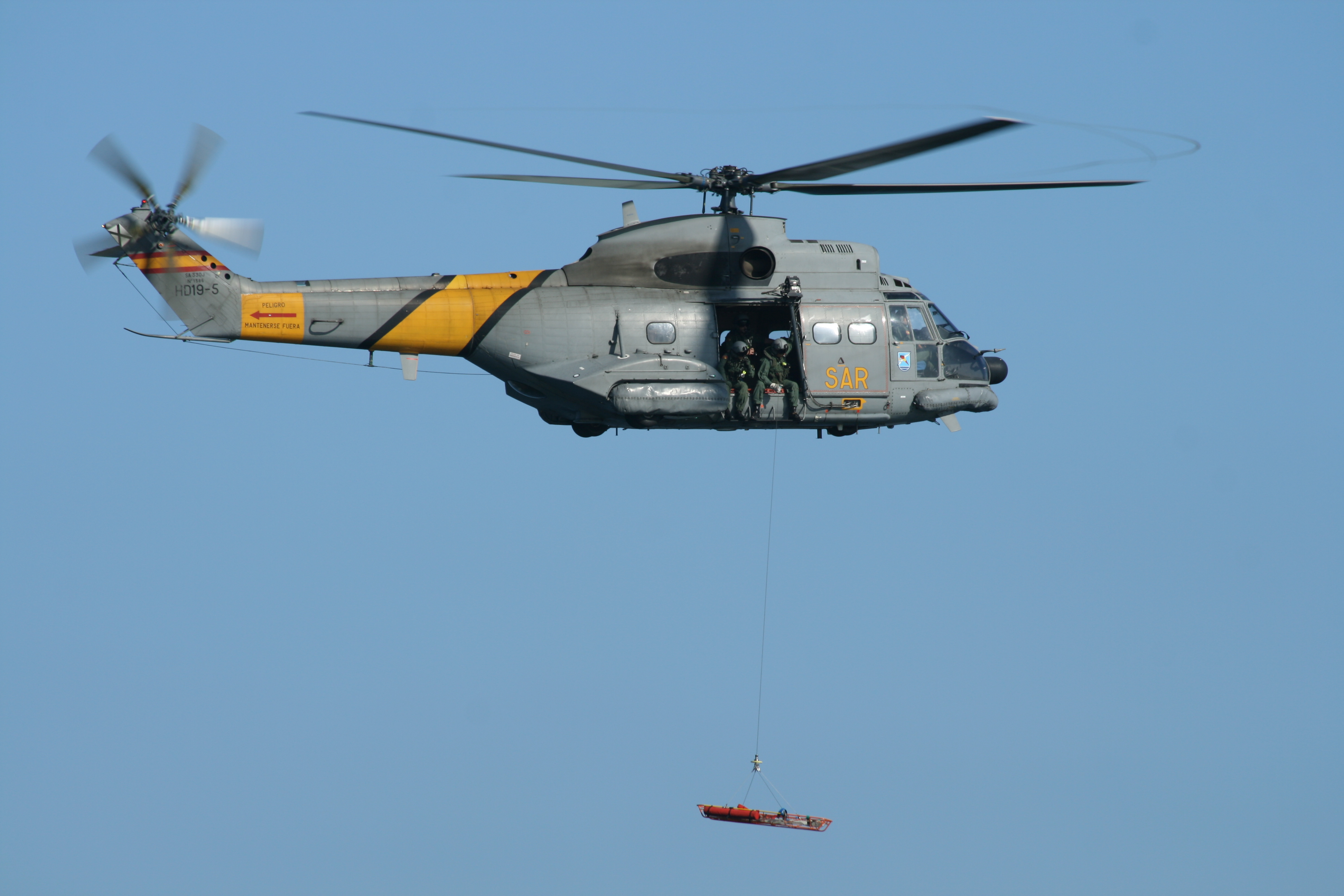
Spanish Air Force Aérospatiale SA330J Puma of the 801 Squadron of the Air Force. Note the lettering reading "SAR".

Rotary and fixed wing aircraft are used for air and sea rescue. A list of common aircraft used:

- Aérospatiale SA330 Puma
- Aérospatiale SA360 Dauphin
- Airbus Helicopters H175
- AgustaWestland AW109
- AgustaWestland AW139
- AgustaWestland AW101
  - AgustaWestland CH-149 Cormorant
- Bell UH-1 Iroquois
  - Bell CH-146 Griffon
- Boeing Vertol CH-46 Sea Knight
  - CH-113 Labrador and 113A Voyageur
- Eurocopter Dauphin – variant of Aérospatiale SA 360 Dauphin
  - Eurocopter Dolphin HH-65
  - Eurocopter AS365 Dauphin 2
- Eurocopter AS332 Super Puma
  - Eurocopter EC225 Super Puma
  - Eurocopter AS532 Cougar
- Lockheed HC-130 Hercules
- Lockheed P-3 Orion
- Sikorsky S-61
- Sikorsky S-70 Blackhawk
  - Sikorsky HH-60 Jayhawk
  - Sikorsky HH-60 Pave Hawk
  - Sikorsky SH-60 Seahawk
- Sikorsky S-76
- Sikorsky S-92
  - Sikorsky H-92 Superhawk
  - Sikorsky CH-148 Cyclone
- Westland Sea King
- Westland Wessex HC2

== See also ==
E.M.I.L.Y.

- Air-sea rescue
- Bayesian search theory
- Cave rescue
- Coast guard
- Combat search and rescue
- Crash boats of World War 2
- Emergency locator beacon
- Emergency management
- Emergency position-indicating radiobeacon station (EPIRS)
- Firefighter
- Firefighting
- International Aeronautical and Maritime Search and Rescue Manual
- International Cospas-Sarsat Programme
- International Search and Rescue Competition
- Maritime search and rescue
- Mountain rescue
- Pars robot, an Iranian drone designed for sea rescue
- Personal locator beacon
- Rescue robot
- Search and Rescue Optimal Planning System (SAROPS)
- Self rescue (climbing)
- Ski patrol
- Urban search and rescue
