= AKUT Search and Rescue Association =

Turkish non-governmental organization

AKUT Search and Rescue Association AKUT Arama Kurtarma Derneği
- Logo of AKUT
- Abbreviation: AKUT
- Formation: 1996; 30 years ago
- Founder: Nasuh Mahruki, Feridun Çelikmen, Oral Ülkümen, Memet Tanrısever, Nevzat Çetin, Kuvvet Lordoğlu, Alper Sesli
- Type: Non-governmental organization
- Legal status: Charitable
- Purpose: Disaster search and rescue relief
- Location: Şişli, Istanbul, Turkey
- Coordinates: 41.06722°N 28.99885°E
- Region served: International
- Chairman: Serhat AKBEL
- Affiliations: INSARAG, IRO, Global Compact
- Website: www.akut.org.tr

AKUT Search and Rescue Association (Turkish: AKUT Arama Kurtarma Derneği) is a Turkish non-governmental organization for disaster search and rescue relief. It was established in 1995 as a grassroots organization by seven leading outdoor athletes of Turkey and officially founded as an association in 1996.

The organization delivers emergency and disaster relief to people trapped in caves, lost on mountains or to victims of earthquake or flood disasters at home and abroad. The initial purpose of the association's establishment was to provide search and rescue relief for climbers in emergencies as no local organization of this type existed so far.

== History ==
The group was formed first in the aftermath of a mountaineering accident occurred in 1994 on Bolkar Mountains, at which two local climbers were involved. In December 1995, a group of volunteer mountaineers conducted their first organized mission on Mt. Uludağ, and rescued people, who got lost in the fog, freezing in heavy snowfall. It was during this operation that the group named itself "AKUT", which is a concept in medicine terminology.

The organization was officially incorporated in the beginning of 1996. The members received earthquake and flood training within the next year. This qualified the organization to work cooperative alongside official agencies during their efforts of natural disaster relief. On January 15, 1999, AKUT was given the status of a charitable organization by the Turkish government.

AKUT became generally known after it quickly reacted to the 1999 İzmit earthquake, and worked with its 150 permanent members and coordinated over 1,000 helpers, who rescued about 200 people from the debris.

In 1999, the organization became a member of United Nations' Search and Rescue Advisory Group (INSARAG). AKUT was officially recognized in 2011 as a "mid-sized search and rescue team" by INSARAG.

AKUT undertook international missions following the 1999 Athens earthquake in Greece, the 1999 Taiwan earthquake, the 2001 Gujarat earthquake in India and the 2003 Bam earthquake in Iran.

AKUT responded immediately to the massive earthquakes of Feb 6, 2023, sending 30 teams to Kahramanmaraş, Adiyaman, Gaziantep, Malatya, Hatay, Osmaniye and Adana.

== Organization ==
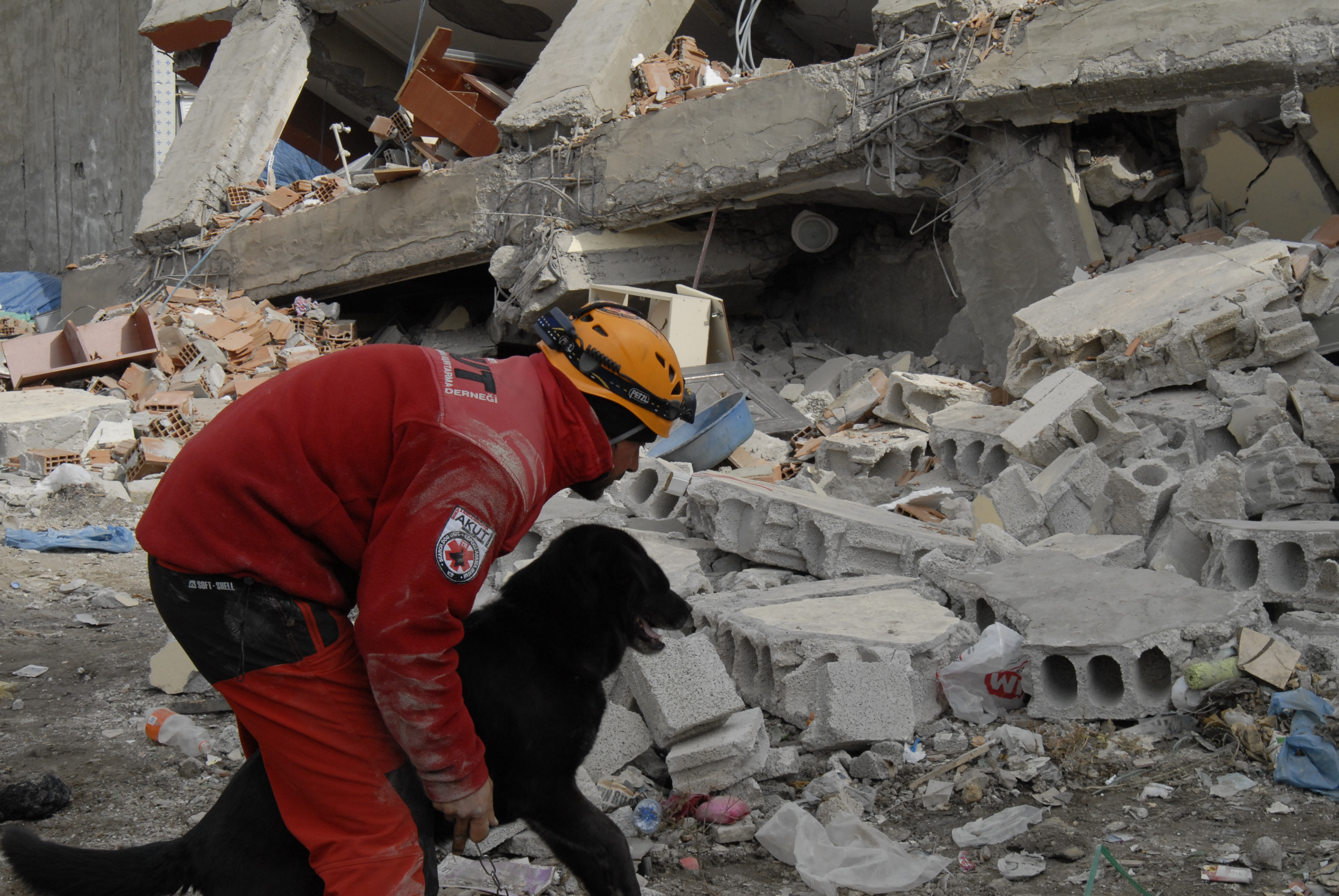
An AKUT member with his search dog at action among the ruins after the 2011 Van earthquake.

As of 2015, the organization counts about 250 core members and is also able to deploy around one thousand volunteers if needed. It has appropriate technical equipment for its operations. The headquarters in Istanbul coordinates 35 teams formed in various cities across the country and organize also specific training courses related to search and rescue, disaster preparedness and response for the members and the volunteers. The number of people rescued by AKUT totaled 2062 as of June 2015.
