= SDF =

SDF may refer to:

== Computing ==
=== File formats ===
- Spatial Data File, for geodatabases
- Standard Delay Format, for timing data
- SQL Server Compact Edition Database File (filename extension: .sdf)
- Structure data file, for chemical tables
- Scientific Data Format, a Hierarchical Data Format implementation

=== Formal computer science ===
- Signed distance function (or field), in mathematical applications
- Syntax Definition Formalism, to describe formal languages

=== Other uses in computing ===
- Software development folder, a physical or virtual container for software project artifacts
- Synchronous Data Flow, a restriction of Kahn process networks
- SDF Public Access Unix System, a shared shell provider

== Entertainment and media ==
- Südtirol Digital Fernsehen, a TV station in South Tyrol, Italy
- Super Dimensional Fortress, warships in the Robotech/Macross franchise
- Settlement Defense Front (SDF), an enemy faction of Call of Duty: Infinite Warfare

== Organizations ==
=== Military forces ===
- Japan Self-Defense Forces
- State defense force, US
- Sudan Defence Force, 1925–1955
- Syrian Democratic Forces, 2015–2026

=== Political parties ===
- Sikkim Democratic Front, India
- Social Democratic Federation (United States), 1936–1956
- Social Democratic Federation, UK, 1884–1911
- Social Democratic Forum, Hong Kong, 2000
- Social Democratic Front (disambiguation), Cameroon and Ghana
- Socialist Democratic Federation (Japan), 1978–1994

=== Other organizations ===
- Scouts de France, youth group
- Serb Democratic Forum, Serbs of Croatia
- Search Dog Foundation, rescue dog training organization

== Places ==
- Louisville Muhammad Ali International Airport (formerly Standiford Field), Kentucky, US (by IATA code
- Soquel Demonstration State Forest, California, US

== Science ==
- Silver diammine fluoride, in dentistry
- Stromal cell-derived factor (disambiguation), SDF1, SDF1a, etc.
- Subwavelength-diameter optical fibre
- Synchronous diaphragmatic flutter or hiccup

== Other uses ==
- SDF Group (SAME Deutz-Fahr), an Italian-based agricultural machine manufacturer
- Simplified directional facility, an aviation instrument approach navigational aid
- Stochastic discount factor, in econometrics
