= Dog Heroes of September 11th =

Book

- Author: Nona Kilgore Bauer
- Publisher: Kennel Club Books
- Pages: 352
- ISBN: 9781593789985
- OCLC: 770064607
- Dewey Decimal: 636.70886

Dog Heroes of September 11th is a book by Nona Kilgore Bauer, who wrote many other books about dogs. It is an account of the dogs which were used to search for survivors and human remains in the aftermath of the September 11 attacks on the World Trade Center, Pentagon and other sites in the USA. It includes profiles of individual dogs such as Ana – a Golden Retriever which was one of the first dogs to be used.

An expanded second edition was produced for the 10th anniversary. This had several more chapters, many more photographs and a foreword by Rudy Giuliani. Additional topics covered included the use of therapy dogs by survivors of the 9/11 attack and war dogs by the US military in Iraq and Afghanistan.

== Awards ==
Winner of Benjamin Franklin Award in the Animals/Pets category for 2007.

== Reception ==
A review in Library Journal concluded "This book will touch the soul; highly recommended for public libraries, regardless of their size."

A review in School Library Journal described it as "A compelling browsing item that will attract teens."

Professor Simon Wendt analysed the book in a study of the presentation of dogs as heroes. He found its treatment to be ambivalent in that the dogs were regarded as human tools, which diminished their heroic qualities.
