= Human remains dog =

Human remains dog may refer to:

- Police dog
- Search and rescue dog
