= Kidnapping =

Unlawful abduction of someone and holding them captive

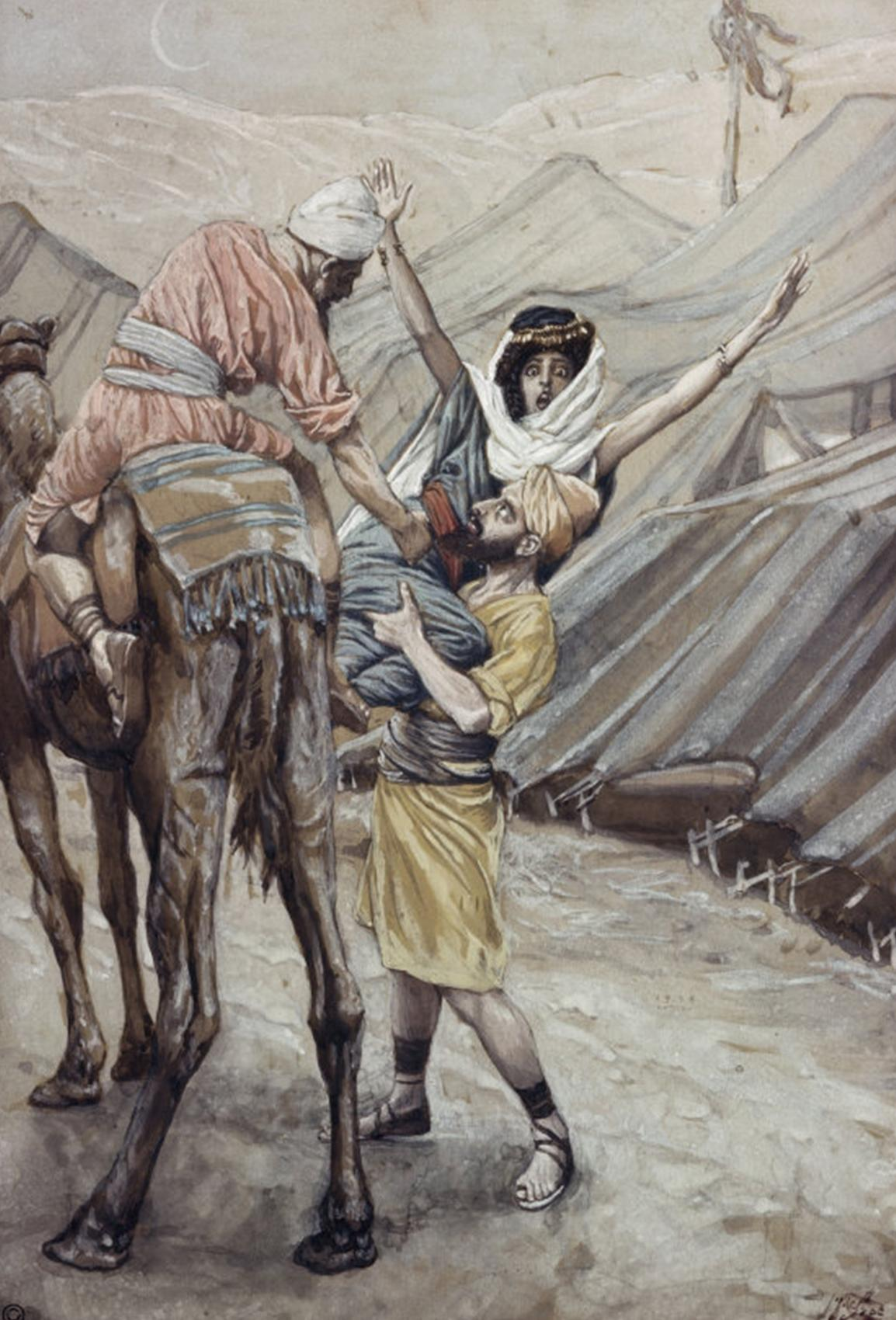
The abduction of Dinah (watercolor, c. 1896–1902 by James Tissot)

Kidnapping is the illegal relocation (abduction) and confinement of a person against their will, and is a crime in many jurisdictions. Kidnapping may be accomplished by use of force or fear, or a victim may be enticed into confinement by fraud or deception. Kidnapping is distinguished from false imprisonment by the intentional movement of the victim to a different location.

Kidnapping may be done to demand a ransom in exchange for releasing the victim, or for other illegal purposes. Kidnapping can be accompanied by bodily injury, which in some jurisdictions elevates the crime to aggravated kidnapping.

Child abduction may be a distinct crime, depending on jurisdiction.

== Motives ==
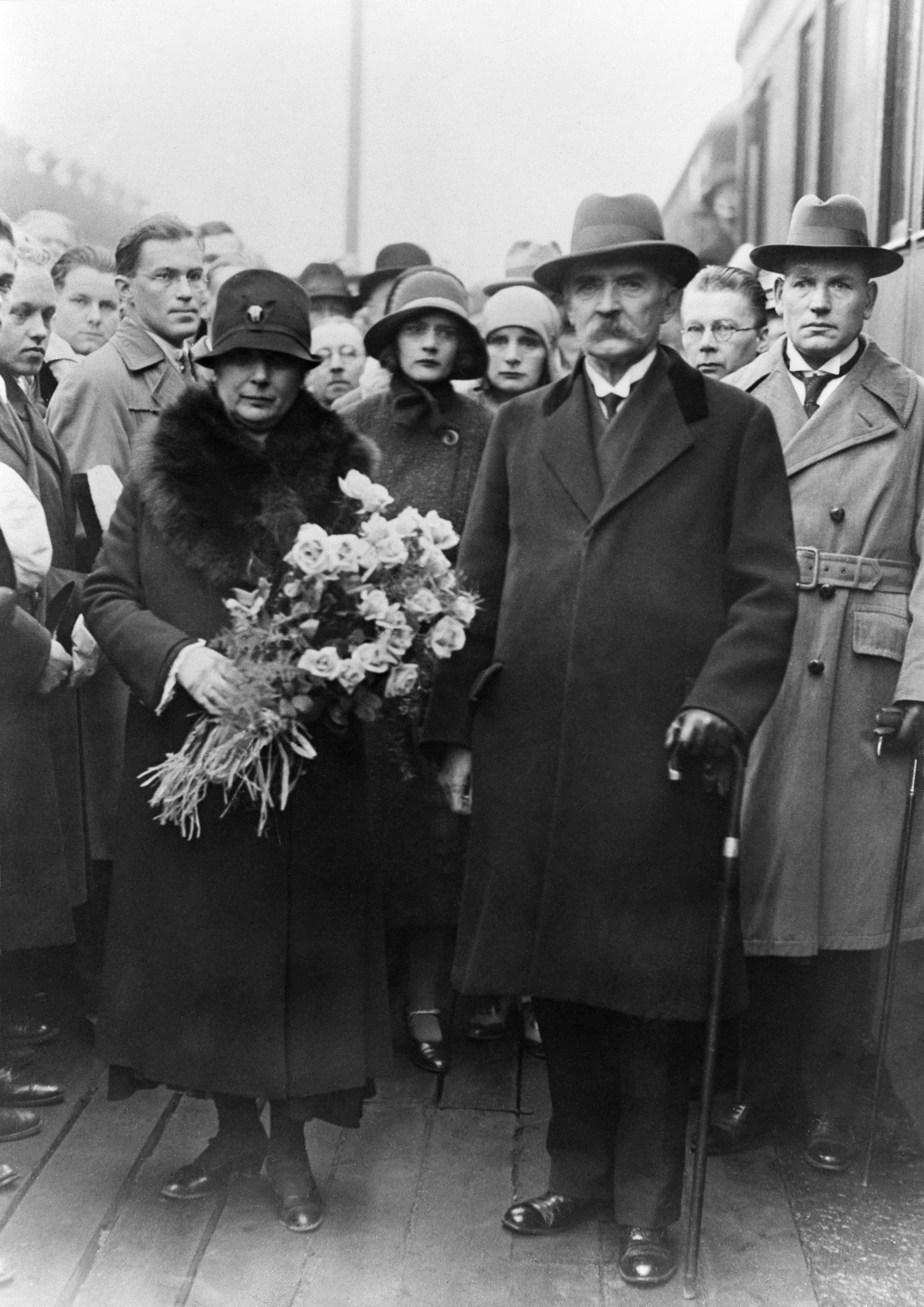
K. J. Ståhlberg (in the center-right), the first President of the Republic of Finland, and his wife at the Helsinki Central Station after their kidnapping. Their daughter Elli Ståhlberg stands in the center, behind them.

Kidnapping can occur for a variety of reasons, with motivations for the crime varying particularly based on the perpetrator.

=== Ransom ===
The kidnapping of a person, most often an adult, for ransom is a common motivation behind kidnapping. This method is primarily utilized by larger organizations, such as criminal gangs, terrorist organizations, or insurgent groups. Typically this is done for financial incentive, with sums of money varying depending on the victim or the method of kidnapping.

Mexican gangs are estimated to have made up to $250 million in kidnappings from Central American migrants.

According to a 2022 study by political scientist Danielle Gilbert, armed groups in Colombia engage in ransom kidnappings as a way to maintain the armed groups' local systems of taxation. The groups resort to ransom kidnappings to punish tax evasion and incentivize inhabitants not to shirk. A 2024 study argued that insurgent groups are more likely to engage in kidnappings "under two conditions: to generate support and reinstate bargaining capacity when organizations suffer military losses on the battlefield and to enforce loyalties and display strength when organizations face violent competition from other non-state actors."

Kidnapping has been identified as one source by which terrorist organizations have been known to obtain funding.

Express kidnapping is a method of abduction used in some countries, mainly from Latin America, where a small ransom, that a company or family can easily pay, is demanded. Express kidnapping is also used for an immediate ransom in which the victim is taken to an ATM and forced to give the captor money.

Tiger kidnapping occurs when a person is kidnapped, and the captor forces them to commit a crime such as robbery or murder. The victim is held hostage until the captor's demands are met. The term originates from the usually long preceding observation, like a tiger does when stalking prey. This is a method which has been used by the Real Irish Republican Army and the Continuity Irish Republican Army.

Virtual kidnapping is a unique form of kidnapping that has risen in recent years. Unlike previous forms of kidnapping, virtual kidnapping does not actually involve a victim of any kind. The scam involves a process of calling numerous people on the phone and making them believe the caller has a victim's loved one, such as a child, in order to gain a quick ransom from the victim. Previously these calls used to affect Spanish speaking communities in large cities, such as Los Angeles or Houston. Until around 2015 when the calls started to be directed to English speakers as well. Around 80 victims were identified as falling for this scam, with losses ranging close to $100,000. While most perpetrators behind this scam can be linked back to Mexico, one instance occurred in Houston, Texas. Yanette Rodriguez Acosta was found guilty of accosting victims for large sums of money, which she would pick up at a set drop off of point. She was sentenced to seven years in prison, with an additional three years of supervision following her release.

In the past, and presently in some parts of the world (such as southern Sudan), kidnapping is a common means used to obtain slaves and money through ransom. In the 19th century, kidnapping in the form of shanghaiing (or "pressganging") men supplied merchant ships with sailors, whom the law considered unfree labour.

=== Pirates ===
Kidnapping on the high seas in connection with piracy has been increasing. It was reported that 661 crewmembers were taken hostage and 12 kidnapped in the first nine months of 2009. The IMB Piracy Reporting Centre recorded that 141 crew members were taken hostage and 83 were kidnapped in 2018.

=== Other ===
Other motivations behind kidnapping include the kidnap of a person for sexual assault purposes, or situations of domestic violence. For example, the 2003 Domestic Violence Report in Colorado shows in most instances of domestic violence people, most typically white females, will be taken from their residence by a present or former spouse or significant other. Often they will be taken by force, not with a weapon, and victims will be freed without injury to their person.

Bride kidnapping is a term often applied loosely, to include any bride "abducted" against the will of her parents, even if she is willing to marry the "abductor". It still is traditional amongst certain nomadic peoples of Central Asia. It has seen a resurgence in Kyrgyzstan since the fall of the Soviet Union and the subsequent erosion of women's rights.

Kidnapping has sometimes been used by the family and friends of a cult member as a method to remove them from the cult and begin a deprogramming process to change their allegiance away from the group.

Motivations for kidnapping cannot always be easily defined. During the 1990s and afterward, for example, the New York divorce coercion gang was involved in a sting of kidnappings. They would take Jewish husbands from their homes in New York and New Jersey and torture them in order for them to grant gittin, or religious divorces, to their wives. The gang is notorious for crimes of this nature. They were later apprehended for their crimes on 9 October 2013, in connection with a foiled kidnapping plot.

== By jurisdiction ==
Jurisdiction of kidnapping varies depending on the country, with each one having their own way of defining and prosecuting the crime. Some such countries with clearly defined laws on kidnapping include:

=== Australia ===
In Australia, kidnapping is a criminal offence, as defined by either the State Crimes Act or the Commonwealth Criminal Code. It is a serious indictable offence, and is punishable by up to 25 years' imprisonment.

=== Canada ===
Kidnapping that does not result in a homicide is a hybrid offence that comes with a maximum possible penalty of life imprisonment (18 months if tried summarily). A murder that results from kidnapping is classified as 1st-degree, with a sentence of life imprisonment that results from conviction (the mandatory penalty for murder under Canadian law).

=== Mexico ===
The General Law to Prevent and Punish Crimes of Kidnapping establishes a prison sentence of 20–40 years for an individual convicted of holding another person as a hostage. The prison term increases to 25–45 years if the kidnapping occurred with violence against the victims, and then increases to 25–50 years if the kidnapping was committed by members of public safety. If the kidnapping results in homicide, the prison sentence will be from 40 to 70 years.

=== Pakistan ===
In Pakistan, there are two kinds of kidnapping: Kidnapping from Pakistan and kidnapping from lawful guardianship. Penal Code 360 states that whoever conveys any person beyond the limits of Pakistan without the consent of that person or of some person legally authorized to consent on behalf of that person is said to kidnap that person from Pakistan. Penal Code 363 states that whoever kidnaps any person from Pakistan or lawful guardianship shall be punished with imprisonment of either description of a term which may extend to seven years and shall also be liable to a fine. Kidnapping with a motive of murder, hurt, slavery, or to the lust of any person shall be punished with imprisonment for life with rigorous imprisonment for a term which may extend to ten years and shall also be liable to a fine.

=== Netherlands ===
Article 282 prohibits hostaging (and 'kidnapping' is a kind of 'hostaging'). Part 1 of Article 282 allows sentencing kidnappers to maximum imprisonment of eight years or a fine of the fifth category. Part 2 allows maximum imprisonment of nine years or a fine of the fifth category if there are serious injuries. Part 3 allows maximum imprisonment of 12 years or a fine of the fifth category if the victim has been killed. Part 4 allows sentencing people that collaborate with kidnapping (such as proposing or make available a location where the victim hostaged). Part 1, 2 and 3 will apply also to them.

=== England and Wales ===
Kidnapping is an offence under the common law of England and Wales. Lord Brandon said in 1984 R v D:

First, the nature of the offence is an attack on, and infringement of, the personal liberty of an individual. Secondly, the offence contains four ingredients as follows: (1) the taking or carrying away of one person by another; (2) by force or fraud; (3) without the consent of the person so taken or carried away; and (4) without lawful excuse.

In all cases of kidnapping of children, where it is alleged that a child has been kidnapped, it is the absence of the consent of that child which is material. This is the case regardless of the age of the child. A very small child will not have the understanding or intelligence to consent. This means that absence of consent will be a necessary inference from the age of the child. It is a question of fact for the jury whether an older child has sufficient understanding and intelligence to consent. Lord Brandon said: "I should not expect a jury to find at all frequently that a child under fourteen had sufficient understanding and intelligence to give its consent." If the child (being capable of doing so) did consent to being taken or carried away, the fact that the person having custody or care and control of that child did not consent to that child being taken or carried away is immaterial. If, on the other hand, the child did not consent, the consent of the person having custody or care and control of the child may support a defence of lawful excuse. It is known as Gillick competence.

Regarding restriction on prosecution, no prosecution may be instituted, except by or with the consent of the Director of Public Prosecutions, for an offence of kidnapping if it was committed against a child under the age of sixteen and by a person connected with the child, within the meaning of section 1 of the Child Abduction Act 1984. Kidnapping is an indictable-only offence. Kidnapping is punishable with imprisonment or fine at the discretion of the court. There is no limit on the fine or the term of imprisonment that may be imposed provided the sentence is not inordinate.

A parent should only be prosecuted for kidnapping their own child "in exceptional cases, where the conduct of the parent concerned is so bad that an ordinary right-thinking person would immediately and without hesitation regard it as criminal in nature".

=== United States ===
Following the highly publicized 1932 Lindbergh kidnapping, Congress passed the Federal Kidnapping Act, which authorized the FBI to investigate kidnapping at a time when the Bureau was expanding in size and authority. The fact that a kidnapped victim may have been taken across state lines brings the crime within the ambit of federal criminal law.

Most states recognize different types of kidnapping and punish according to such factors as the location, duration, method, manner and purpose of the offense. There are several deterrents to kidnapping in the United States of America. Among these are:

1. The extreme logistical challenges involved in successfully exchanging the money for the return of the victim without being apprehended or surveilled.
2. Harsh punishment. Convicted kidnappers face lengthy prison terms. If a victim is brought across state lines, federal charges can be laid as well.
3. Good cooperation and information sharing between law enforcement agencies, and tools for spreading information to the public (such as the Amber alert system).

In 2009, Phoenix, Arizona reported over 300 cases of kidnapping, gaining it a reputation as America's kidnapping capital, as according to the Los Angeles Times. Hundreds of kidnappings for ransom occurred in the city, as per the Times, most of them having connections to Mexican drug and human trafficking as a way to pay off unpaid debts. These statistics would have made the city have the highest kidnapping rate of any U.S. city, and second in the world only to Mexico City. However, an investigation and later audit by the U.S. Department of Justice Inspector General found these statistics to be falsified. Only 59 federally reportable kidnappings occurred in 2008. This is in comparison to the over 300 claimed kidnappings on grant applications. The falsified data can be attributed to a variety of issues within the southwestern United States as a whole, including misclassification by local police, lack of unified standards, a desire for Federal grants, or the Mexican drug war.

== Statistics ==
Global kidnapping hotspots
	1999	2006	2014	2018
1	Pakistan	Pakistan	Pakistan	Pakistan
2	Mexico	Iraq	India	England
3	Brazil	India	Mexico	Germany
4	Philippines	South Africa	Iraq	Mexico
5	Venezuela	Brazil	Nigeria	Morocco
6	Ecuador	Mexico	Libya	Ecuador
7	Russia and CIS	Ecuador	Afghanistan	Brazil
8	Nigeria	Venezuela	Bangladesh	New Zealand
9	India	Colombia	Sudan	Australia
10	South Africa	Bangladesh	Lebanon	Netherlands

=== Countries with the highest rates ===
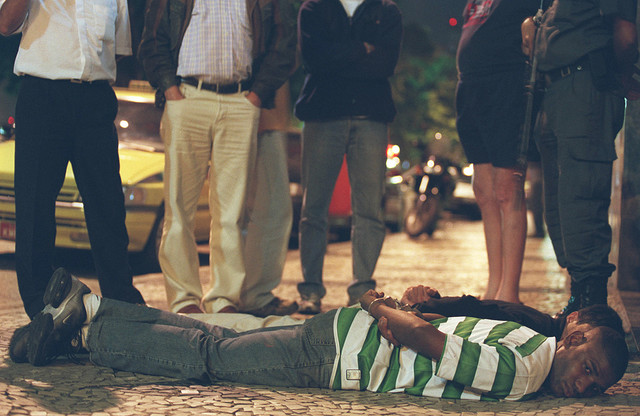
Arrested kidnappers in Rio de Janeiro, Brazil lying on the ground

In 2021, the United Nations Office on Drugs and Crime reported that the United States was the country with most kidnappings, totaling 56,652. This is in comparison to 2010, when they were ranked sixth in the world (by absolute numbers, not per capita) for kidnapping by ransom, according to available statistics (after Colombia, Italy, Lebanon, Peru, and the Philippines).

Kidnapping for ransom is a common occurrence in various parts of the world today. In 2018, the United Nations found Pakistan and England had the highest number of kidnappings while New Zealand had the highest rate among the 70 countries for which data is available. As of 2007, that title belonged to Iraq with possibly 1,500 foreigners kidnapped. In 2004, it was Mexico, and in 2001, it was Colombia. Reports suggest a world total of 12,500–25,500 per year with 3,600 per year in Colombia and 3,000 per year in Mexico around the year 2000. However, by 2016, the number of kidnappings in Colombia had declined to 205 and it continues to decline.

Mexican numbers are hard to confirm because of fears of police involvement in kidnapping. According to Pax Christi, a Catholic peace movement, "Kidnapping seems to flourish particularly in fragile states and conflict countries, as politically motivated militias, organized crime and the drugs mafia fill the vacuum left by government".

Since 2019, the risk of kidnapping has risen worldwide, as a result of the COVID-19 pandemic. This increase is mostly seen in kidnappings for ransom. This factors from a variety of aspects, including socioeconomic disparities, insufficient resources, and flawed judicial systems. Another impact of the COVID-19 pandemic on kidnappers is the economic strain that it had put many families through. This pressured kidnappers to increase kidnappings as well as ransom demands. After 2022, the diminishing effects of COVID-19 have led many countries to welcome back in-person interactions, travel and tourism. The connection between increased tourism and kidnapping is reflected through the rise of global kidnapping rates from 2019 to 2021–2023.

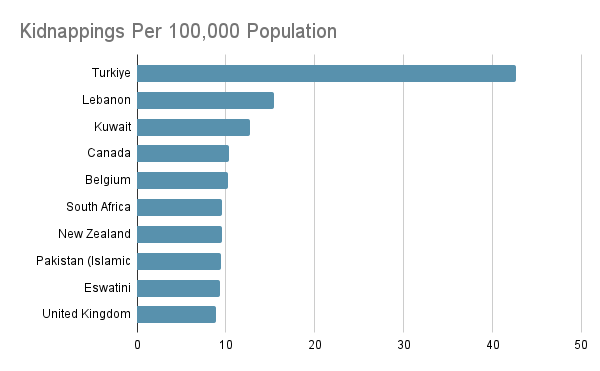
The 10 countries with the highest kidnapping rates in 2023

The highest recorded ransom demand in 2021 was $77.3 million, while in 2019, it was $28.7 million. Between those two years, the average global ransom demand increased 43%, while the median global ransom demand increased by 6%. In Sub-Saharan Africa, regions such as Congo (DRC), Nigeria, and South Africa are likely to maintain higher levels of kidnappings due to ongoing effects of religious extremist groups, recent genocides, and civil wars. While there is no hard evidence of which country had the most kidnappings in 2021, the American region (which includes Mexico) maintains its position as the region with the second highest kidnapping rates.

One notorious failed example of kidnap for ransom was the 1976 Chowchilla bus kidnapping, in which 26 children were abducted with the intention of bringing in a $5 million ransom. The children and driver escaped from an underground van without the aid of law enforcement. According to the Department of Justice, kidnapping makes up 2% of all reported violent crimes against juveniles.

=== By country ===
The annual number of recorded kidnappings per capita by country for the last available year, according to the United Nations Office on Drugs and Crime, is shown in the table below. Each country's definition of kidnapping may differ, and the table does not include unreported kidnappings.

Country	Reported annual kidnappings per 100,000	Year
Albania	0.1	2023
Algeria	0.3	2023
Andorra	0.0	2019
Antigua and Barbuda	1.1	2023
Argentina	0.2	2023
Armenia	2.5	2023
Australia	1.9	2023
Austria	0.1	2023
Azerbaijan	0.1	2021
Bahamas	1.8	2022
Bahrain	0.0	2007
Bangladesh	0.8	2006
Barbados	0.4	2023
Belarus	0.1	2019
Belgium	10.3	2017
Belize	1.2	2022
Benin	4.4	2017
Bermuda	0.0	2017
Bhutan	0.0	2020
Bolivia	0.4	2023
Bosnia and Herzegovina	0.9	2023
Botswana	0.1	2014
Brazil	3.0	2023
Brunei Darussalam	0.0	2006
Bulgaria	1.3	2023
Burundi	0.7	2014
Cabo Verde	2.7	2018
Cameroon	6.4	2023
Canada	10.1	2023
Chile	3.3	2023
Colombia	1.2	2023
Costa Rica	0.3	2023
Croatia	0.0	2023
Cyprus	0.0	2023
Czech Republic	0.1	2023
Dominica	4.5	2023
Dominican Republic	0.9	2020
East Timor	0.3	2017
Ecuador	15.2	2023
Egypt	0.3	2011
El Salvador	0.0	2022
England and Wales	11.6	2022
Estonia	0.0	2023
Eswatini	4.5	2021
Finland	0.1	2023
France	5.9	2016
Georgia	0.1	2010
Germany	6.0	2023
Ghana	0.4	2021
Greece	0.7	2023
Grenada	2.6	2023
Guatemala	0.8	2023
Guinea	0.3	2008
Guinea-Bissau	0.7	2016
Guyana	0.0	2023
Haiti	0.4	2018
Honduras	0.4	2023
Hong Kong	0.0	2023
Hungary	0.1	2023
India	5.1	2013
Indonesia	0.5	2022
Iraq (Central)	1.2	2021
Ireland	2.0	2023
Israel	6.6	2023
Italy	0.2	2023
Jamaica	1.0	2023
Japan	0.4	2023
Jordan	1.3	2023
Kazakhstan	0.4	2017
Kenya	0.1	2022
Kosovo	0.6	2021
Kuwait	12.8	2009
Kyrgyzstan	0.3	2018
Latvia	0.8	2023
Lebanon	15.5	2015
Lesotho	3.1	2009
Liechtenstein	0.0	2023
Lithuania	0.0	2023
Luxembourg	8.0	2022
Macau	0.0	2022
Madagascar	0.0	2015
Maldives	7.4	2017
Malta	0.0	2023
Mauritius	1.8	2021
Mexico	0.5	2023
Moldova	1.1	2023
Monaco	2.7	2016
Mongolia	0.0	2023
Montenegro	0.2	2023
Morocco	1.4	2023
Myanmar	0.0	2023
Namibia	2.5	2021
Nepal	0.1	2016
Netherlands	2.5	2023
New Zealand	8.1	2023
Nicaragua	0.0	2019
Nigeria	0.3	2013
North Macedonia	0.7	2023
Northern Ireland	6.9	2023
Oman	0.1	2023
Pakistan	12.3	2023
Palestine	1.8	2023
Panama	0.2	2023
Paraguay	0.3	2023
Peru	3.7	2022
Philippines	0.1	2023
Poland	0.6	2015
Portugal	2.9	2023
Puerto Rico	0.9	2017
Qatar	0.2	2021
Romania	2.0	2023
Russia	0.2	2020
Rwanda	0.2	2013
Saint Kitts and Nevis	0.0	2023
Saint Lucia	3.3	2023
Saudi Arabia	0.2	2019
Scotland	5.1	2023
Senegal	0.0	2015
Serbia	0.1	2023
Singapore	0.0	2011
Slovakia	0.8	2023
Slovenia	0.1	2023
South Africa	9.5	2017
South Korea	0.1	2023
Spain	0.3	2023
Sri Lanka	0.9	2019
St. Vincent and Grenadines	4.9	2023
Sudan	1.8	2008
Switzerland	0.1	2023
Syria	0.1	2008
São Tomé and Príncipe	0.0	2011
Tajikistan	2.2	2011
Tanzania	0.0	2015
Thailand	0.0	2023
Trinidad and Tobago	1.4	2018
Turkey	42.2	2014
Turkmenistan	2.6	2004
Uganda	2.4	2016
Ukraine	0.8	2020
United Arab Emirates	2.4	2022
United States of America	15.4	2022
Uruguay	0.7	2023
Uzbekistan	0.2	2021
Vatican City	201.8	2023
Venezuela	0.7	2018
Yemen	0.2	2009
Zimbabwe	1.7	2008

== See also ==
- Child abduction
- Crime statistics
- Extraordinary rendition
- Fetal abduction
- Forced disappearance
- International Search and Rescue Dog Organisation (about mantrailing)
- Kidnap and ransom insurance
- List of kidnappings
- Stockholm syndrome
