= Emergency Response Team Search and Rescue =

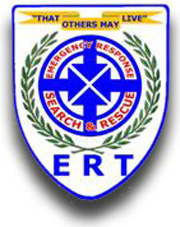
- Founder: Gary Foo
- Purpose: Search and Rescue; International Disaster Response; Civil Contingencies Responder
- Website: http://www.ert-sar.org.uk/

Emergency Response Team Search and Rescue (ERTSAR) is an INSARAG listed international disaster response NGO search and rescue team, with bases in Henley-on-Thames, United Kingdom and Toronto, Canada.

== Founding ==
ERTSAR was founded in the UK on 1 December 2002 as a non-profit NGO by Gary Foo and registered as a charity in England and Wales in 2004.

The UK team was originally known as Oxfordshire Search And Rescue (OSAR), and subsequently renamed to Emergency Response Team Search And Rescue in 2006 to reflect the international disaster response work it was involved in.

In 2011, the Canadian branch of ERTSAR was founded.

== Purpose and Activities ==
ERTSAR was established to respond to emergencies and disasters and relieve suffering and distress among persons affected by hazards, risks, and major incidents across the globe. ERTSAR provides many programmes year round such as medical first responder services, community based and educational programmes, emergency services support, civil defence and civil protection services. ERTSAR also provides disaster risk reduction strategies, resilience, support, assistance and special event cover.

ERTSAR is a UK national DEFRA Flood Response Team with a specialist rescue boat crew available to respond to any area of the country needing assistance in response to flooding incidents.

Both the UK and Canadian teams are also available to be called out by the police in response to high-risk despondent missing person searches, utilising man-tracking and search dog capabilities.

Specialist capabilities include USAR, Swiftwater rescue, Technical rescue and more.

== Funding ==
The charity is run entirely by volunteers and as a voluntary organisation, relies on donations from the public and local businesses. In February 2016, ERTSAR received a grant for £17,713.60 from the Department For Transport's Inland Rescue Boat Grant Scheme for Water Rescue Services.

== Deployments ==
ERTSAR has deployed internationally for major disasters such as Sri Lanka for the 2004 Indian Ocean earthquake and tsunami, to Pakistan for the 2005 Kashmir earthquake, including several follow-up support and relief missions, the 2010 Haiti earthquake and the 2010 Pakistan floods.

The team also mobilised and deployed in the UK for numerous call outs as a Civil Contingencies Responder such as in Oxfordshire for the 2007 United Kingdom floods and the Snow and Ice spell of 2010. The team also worked with Gloucestershire police in successfully locating despondent missing persons.

The UK team deployed its swift water rescue team for the flooding of November 2012 in Gloucestershire and Oxfordshire.

The ERTSAR Canadian team deployed for a week in December 2012 to Staten Island, New York, to assist in the recovery efforts in the aftermath of super storm Hurricane Sandy.

In November 2013, UK and Canadian team members deployed to the Philippines in response to Typhoon Haiyan, the strongest storm ever recorded at landfall. The team provided medical aid and assistance, water purification and debris clearing to remote island communities.

On December 5, 2013, the UK team deployed swift water rescue technicians and boat crews to Norfolk at the request of the National Fire Service via DEFRA in response to the tidal surge and severe storm flooding on the East coast of England.
