= Social Democratic Front =

Social Democratic Front may refer to:

- Social Democratic Front (Cameroon), the main opposition party of Cameroon
- Social Democratic Front (Ghana), a former political party in Ghana (1979–1981)

== See also ==
- SDF (disambiguation) § Political parties
