= Search and rescue dog =

Dog trained to locate or retrieve a missing or trapped person

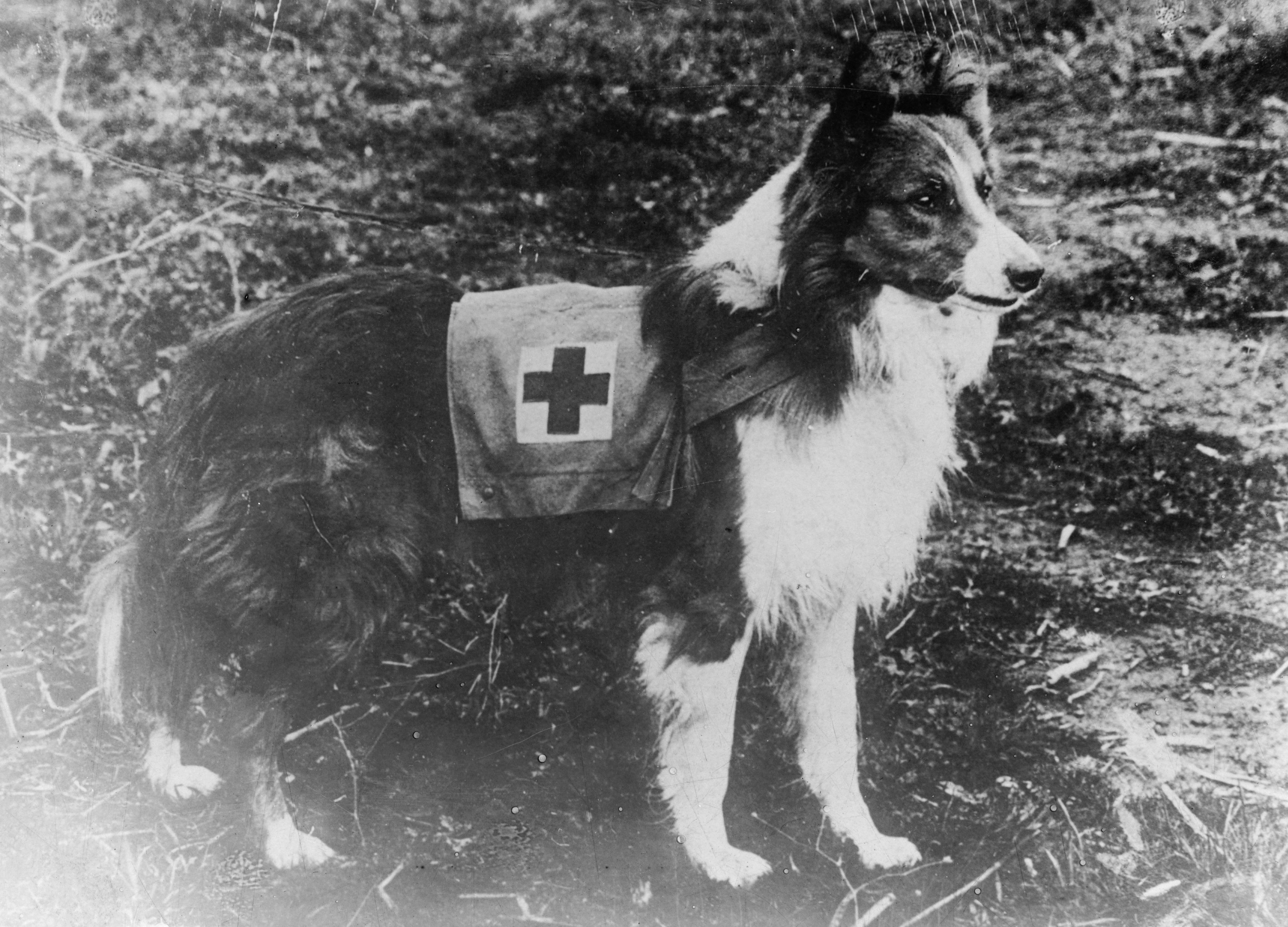
Red Cross Collie, Italy, 1909

A search-and-rescue (SAR) dog is a dog trained to respond to crime scenes, accidents, missing persons events, as well as natural or man-made disasters. These dogs detect human scent, which is a distinct odor of skin flakes and water and oil secretions unique to each person and have been known to find people under water, snow, and collapsed buildings, as well as remains buried underground. SAR dogs are a non-invasive aid in the location of humans, alive or deceased.

== Cadaver dogs ==
Cadaver dogs are working search-and-rescue dogs, specially trained to locate decomposition scent, specific to human decomposition. Also known as Human Remains Detection Dogs (HRDDs), cadaver dogs are employed in forensic contexts to sniff and locate human remains, which can include those that are buried, concealed, or older, as well as body parts, skeletal remains, and soil contaminated with decomposition fluid. Differently to other types of tracking dogs that use scents on the ground or specific items, cadaver dogs are trained to locate both ground and airborne scents, and notify of the area where the scent concentration is highest.

In Croatia, such dogs have been used to find burial sites almost 3000 years old. More recently, HRDD's have been used in Canada and the United States to locate unmarked graves of Indigenous children around former residential school sites. Law enforcement, medical examiners and anthropologists often work closely with cadaver dogs and their handlers, to coordinate searches and evidence and/or body recovery.

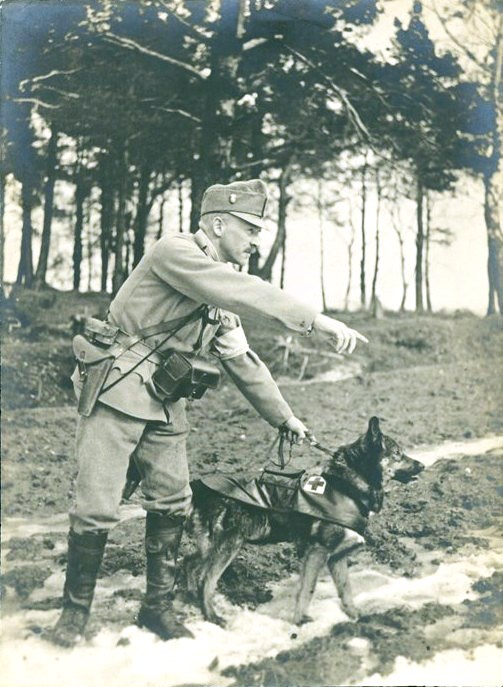
Austro-Hungarian search-and-rescue dog in WWI, 1914.

== History ==
As early as the 17th century, St. Bernard dogs were used by monks at the St. Bernard Hospice in the Swiss Alps, to search for and rescue injured or lost travelers, or find their remains. However, official search and rescue dogs were not first documented for use until WW1, when military trained dogs were used to locate injured soldiers. During WW2, these dogs were used by the British armed forces to locate people buried under rubble.

The history of cadaver dogs is more recent. In 1808, an untrained dog alerted to the shed of a murder suspect, which led to the discovery of the remains of 2 missing women. However, the first use of a dog trained exclusively for cadaver searches in forensic casework was not until 1974 by the New York State Police, when they investigated a homicide in Oneida county, which involved multiple victims buried in a large forested area. From there, training programs were developed, and now specialty cadaver dogs are trained and maintained by police organizations, as well as numerous volunteer search dogs teams.

== Dog selection ==
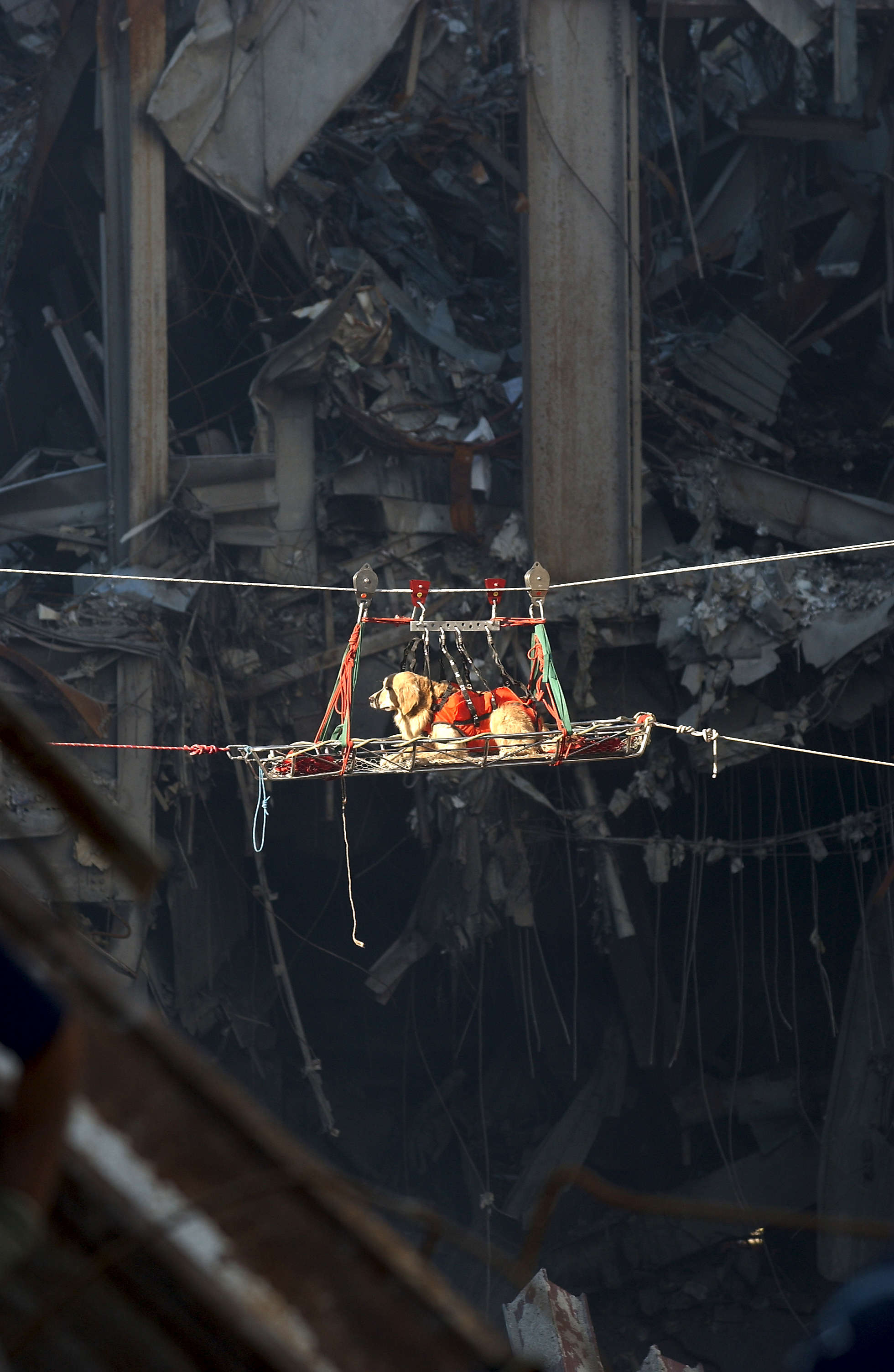
Riley at the World Trade Center, post 9-11-2001 attack.

Common dog breeds used for search-and-rescue work include German Shepherds, Labrador Retriever, Border Collies and Golden Retriever. Most often, purebred dogs are chosen, as it allows a clearer understanding of their potential working abilities, and possible genetic problems. Individual dogs are selected for behaviors related to successful field work, which can include, but is not limited to:

- Good sociability and temperament
- A strong prey drive
- Intelligence
- Endurance.
- Agility
- Adaptability to new environments
- Courage
- Curiosity

Physical characteristics, such as coat and stamina, are also taken into consideration when selecting the appropriate dog for the job.

== Training ==
Many training methods used in SAR training are based on the methods developed to train military dogs during WW1 and WW2. Training of a search dog usually begins when the dog is still a puppy. Training begins with "scent games" when a puppy is 10–12 weeks old. "Hide and seek" activities are introduced as the dog ages, to simulate people lost in disasters. Most SAR dogs, regardless of their task, will spend around 12–18 months in training, for 20 or more hours a week. Some US states require certification before deployment.

Crucial components of training are based on animal learning and focus on repetitions and rewards. Some basic training includes:

- Socialization: Dogs are taken into public settings and are exposed to various experiences and people
- Obedience: How well a dog responds to commands is essential, as much SAR work is conducted without a leash
- Terrain: Exposure to difficult and naturally avoided terrain is necessary for SAR dog training, as during a task they will be required to move carefully and surely on areas containing, for example, rubble, and uneven or cracked ground.
- Behaviour: Consistent rewarding and marking of desired behaviour is necessary to make sure the dog is performing well at each training level before advancing, and also enforces the desired outcome.

=== Alerts ===
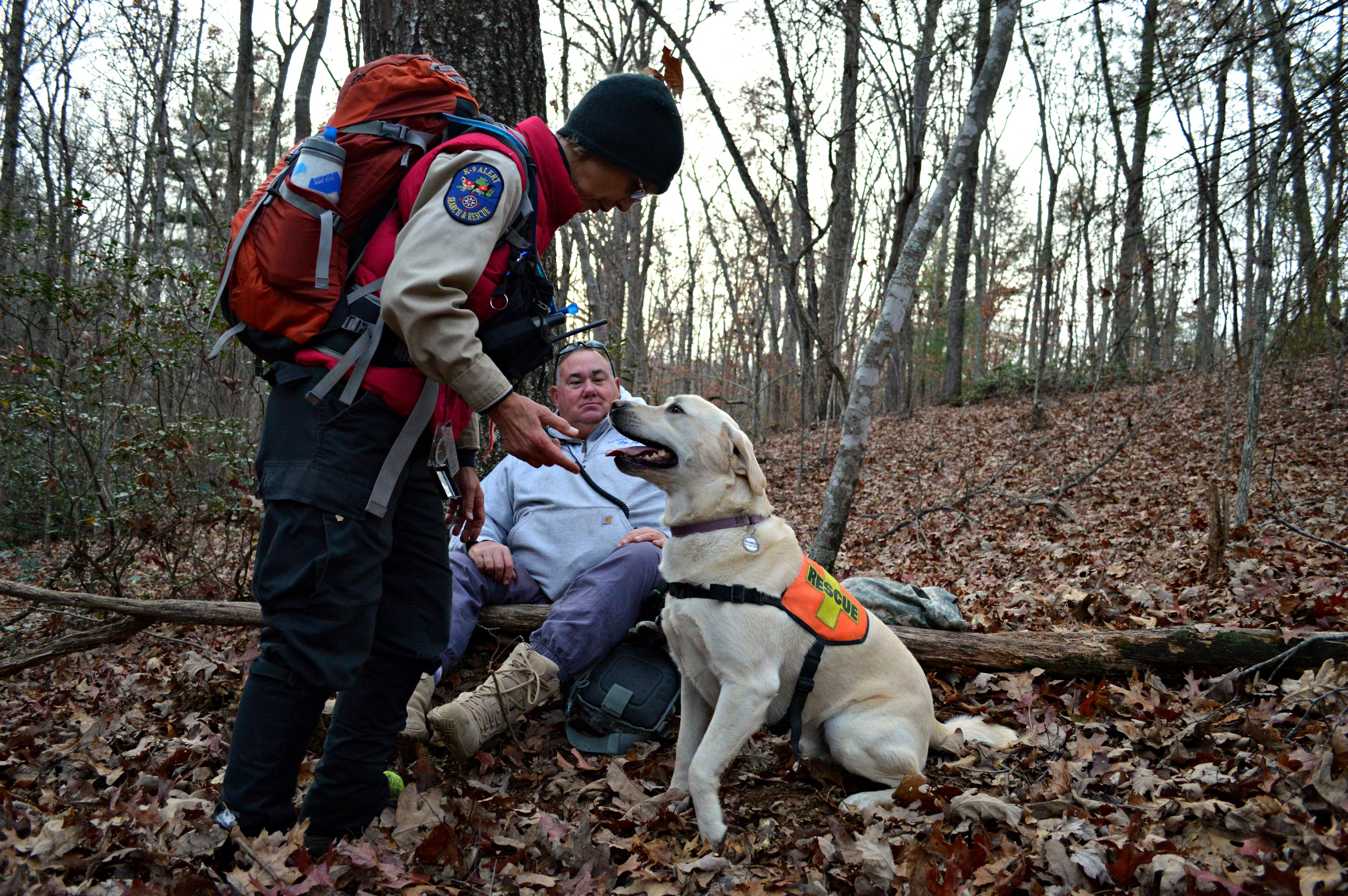
A search-and-rescue dog and their handler, after a successful training session.

A dog in training will develop an alert, a behaviour their handler will be able to interpret when the dog has located the source of a scent. These behaviours can be passive, active, or both. Passive indications may include poking and holding of the snout or sitting, whereas active indications may involve barking, scratching, or digging.

=== Training aids ===
Scent sources used to train SAR dogs are known as training aids. Aids can either be natural or artificial scent sources. Common natural aids are:

- Human flesh: the most authentic scent source that can be obtained fresh or in various stages of decomposition. However, due to ethical and legislation considerations, it is hard to obtain.
- Human blood: another authentic scent source that can be aged to different stages of putrefaction, can simulate crime scenes, and be buried.
- Soil samples: soils dug from the sites of bodies contain decomposition by-products helpful for training, but is required to be dug from legitimate burial sites.
- Adipocere: a by-product of decomposition in a wet environment that is an authentic scent source, but does require a body to obtain

Common artificial aids include:

- Putrescine and Cadaverine: chemical compounds used for imprinting cadaver dogs, similar to those created during the natural decomposition process.
- Sigma Pseudo Distressed Body: simulates the scent of a nonresponsive, live victim.

These scented aids can be placed on toys, in containers or in tubes, which are then commonly placed in concrete blocks and used to train SAR dogs. Because live human scents are all unique, training aids for SAR dogs must be rotated and varied during training.

In training, dogs must demonstrate a willingness to work despite distractions, proper command control, and the ability to learn through positive reward reinforcement. There are many different training methods available, and for all different types of SAR, and each will work better with some dogs, and not so much with others. It is important for the handler to select the methods that work best for their dog, while ensuring they follow 3 main principles: "Patience, perseverance, and praise".

Once a team is trained, their skills and competency must be upheld with regular practice and additional training. "Maintenance training" is required to prevent the deterioration of olfactory performance and strong alert behaviours.

=== Cadaver dog training ===
Cadaver dog training is more specific, and in addition to regular SAR training, requires regular and repeated exposure to target scents. In the case of cadaver dogs, this scent is natural or synthetic decomposition fluid. Human teeth are also used. Ideally, dogs that are trained for the location of cadavers would have prior scent searching experience. Properly trained cadaver dogs preserve human remains, as they know not to pick or dig them up. Training aids can include a combination of mock decomposition scent chemicals, animal remains and human remains. When animal remains are used, it is strictly to "proof" the canine from alerting on animal remains. This is a critical component in training cadaver dogs.

== Handlers ==
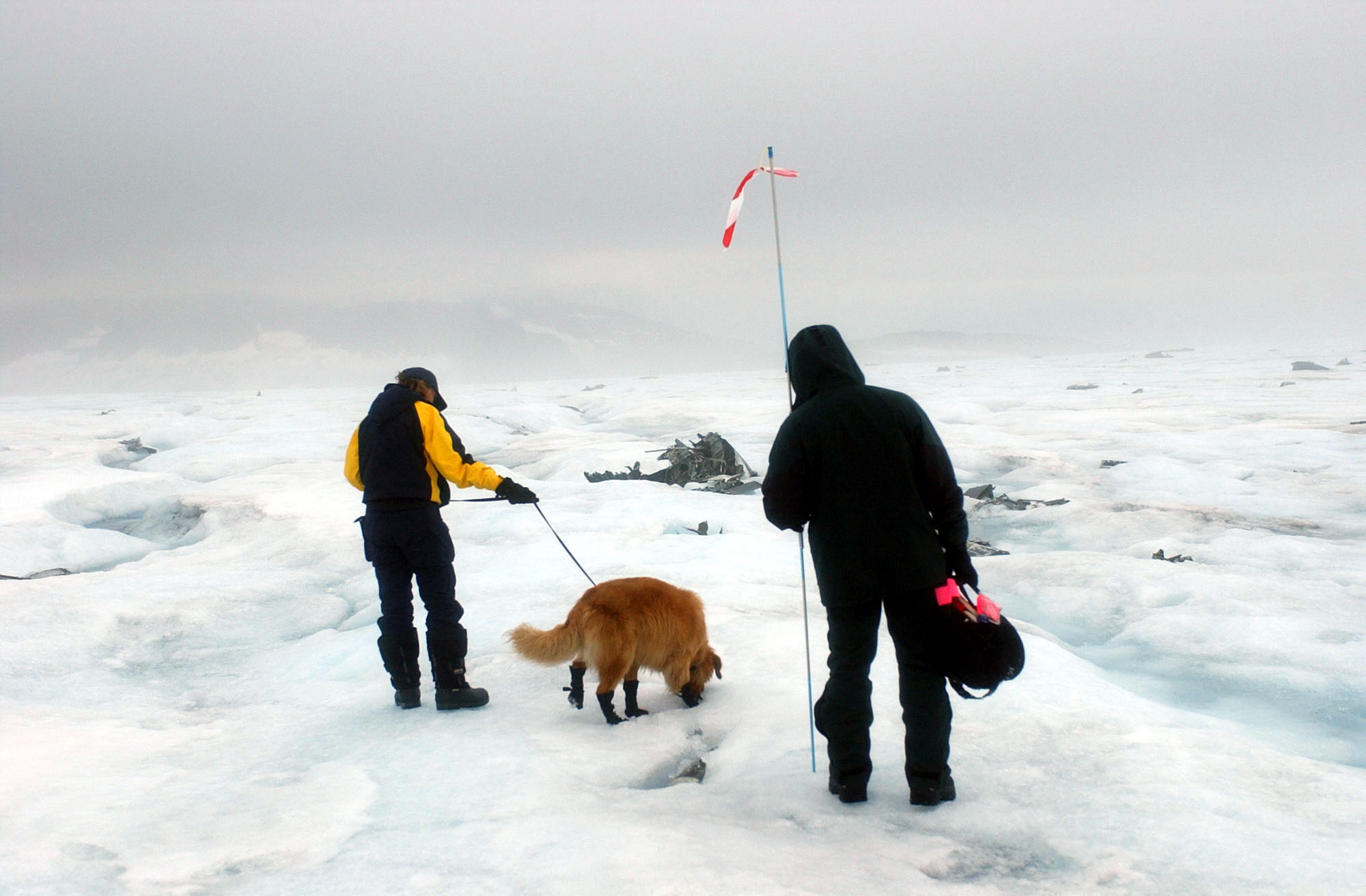
A cadaver dog and its handler search for human remains at a plane crash site in Greenland.

SAR dogs do not work alone. Most SAR teams consist of volunteer handlers and their personal pet dogs, who are also their work partners. The main responsibility of the handler is to ensure the dog remains safe, operational, and in good health. In order for an SAR dog to be as effective as it can be, it must be paired with an equally well-trained handler in the field, who is capable and familiar with the dogs' body language and alerts.

Important characteristics and skills of a handler include:

- Being physically fit
- Applicable knowledge of canine training
- A strong bond with the dog
- Good teamwork and cooperation skills
- Can perform accurate record keeping duties
- Skills in canine and human first aid
- Wilderness survival
- Familiarity with the behaviors of lost persons

For cadaver searches, the handler must also have an understanding of:

- Decomposition fluid odour production
- How the odour disperses in different environments
- Explaining to courts and law enforcement how dogs perform their task

Though the actual locating of a scent depends on the SAR dog, the handler's level of competency is critical in SAR operations. The responsibility falls on the handler to properly recognize and call the dogs alert, or change in behaviour towards an odour, to locate the source of scent. Failing to call an alert could result in missing a target odour source, meaning a person, cadaver, or remains may not be found. On the other hand, misidentifying dog behaviour for an alert may lead to false location identification. Ideally, dogs work with only one handler for the duration of their career, from training as a puppy up until their retirement, and reassignment is a last resort scenario, as it terminates all work with the prior handler. Communication between the dog and their handler is often subtle and nonverbal, making it hard for other handlers to 'read' and understand.

== Limitations ==
Environmental factors can greatly affect SAR performance. Temperature, wind direction, wind speed, and humidity all affect the way scent moves through air, and may create a inconsistent scent for the dogs to track. Soil type as well affects searching. Sandy or dry soil, for example, is more likely to permit scent escape than clay or wet soil. Heavy plant growth may also prevent a dog from being able to search an area. Physical characteristics of a missing individual may also affect searching, as a larger adult would deliver a greater scent than a small infant, meaning the ability to track the scent will differ, depending on who is being located. As well, if the person was clothed or wrapped when they went missing or died, this may prevent scent escape or slow decomposition, making the scent harder for SAR dogs to track.

Common in SAR scenes are chemicals, such as petroleum, which can affect the scent tracking accuracy of a dog. It is important that dogs are given the time to adjust to the environment before beginning the task, and that handlers are aware of any possible contaminants. Because correct identification of a scent location depends on both dog scent tracking and the handlers interpretation of the signal, there is the possibility a handler could misinterpret or fail to recognize an alert. As well, because dogs are not perfect, they are also susceptible to bad days, with causes such as physical ailments or a failure to acclimate to the tracking environment.

In terms of standards, there are no current standard in place to determine the effectiveness of SAR dogs. Little is known on how to optimize their performance and effectiveness. There are currently no standards or international certification existing for cadaver dogs. However, there are proficiency tests available, and dog handlers can become certified as expert witnesses in court.

== Organizations ==
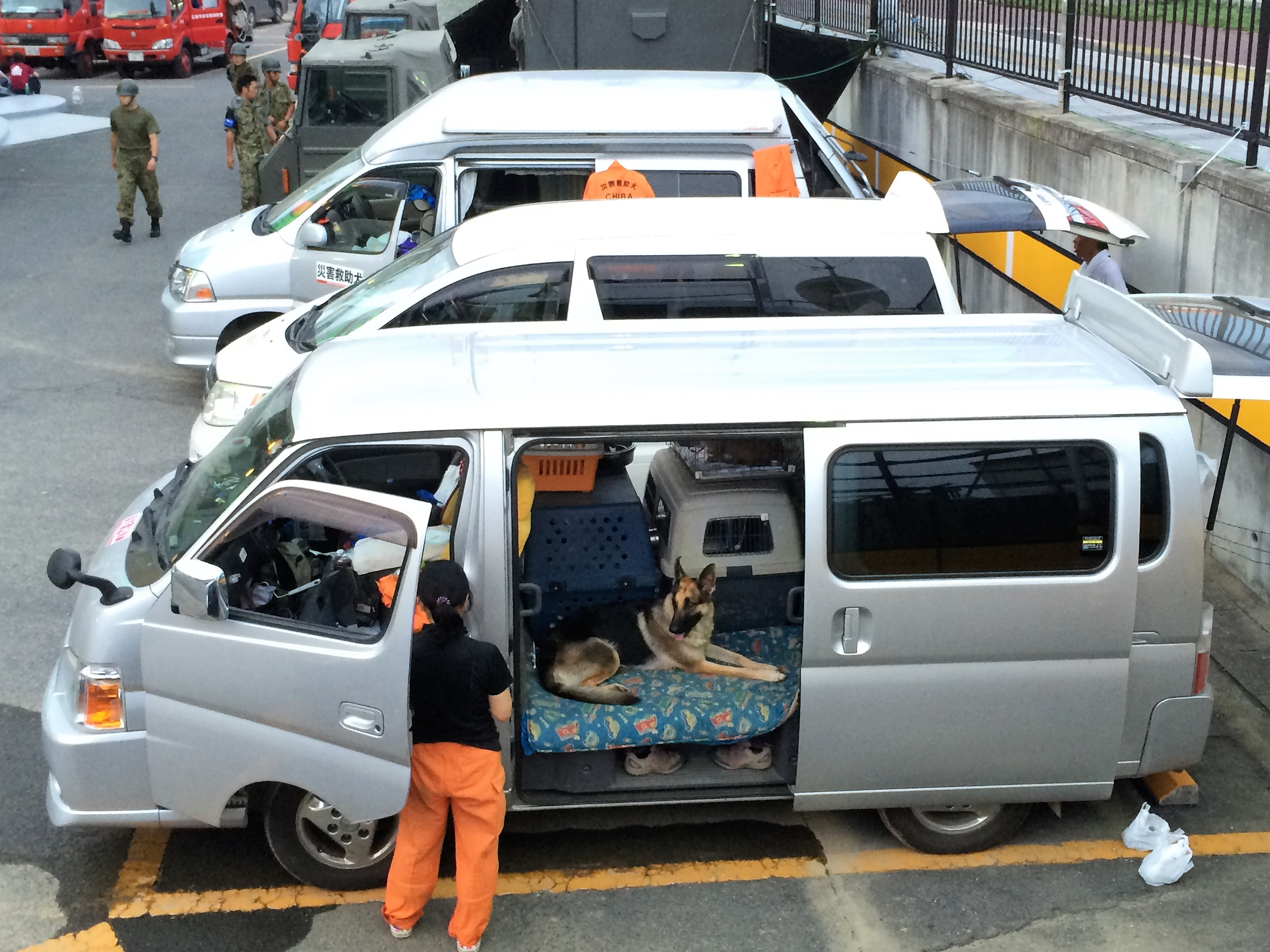
Rescue dog waiting at a disaster site (2014 Hiroshima landslides)

Numerous countries, cities and regions have search and rescue organizations using dog-and-handler teams that can be mobilized in an emergency or disaster. A few notable organizations are:

- International Search and Rescue Dog Organisation (IRO) is the worldwide umbrella organization for training and testing of search and rescue dog work. IRO partners with International Search and Rescue Advisory Group and United Nations for coordinating disaster relief missions worldwide.
- The National Association For Search And Rescue (NASAR) has established voluntary standards for various types of SAR dogs
- FEMA Urban Search and Rescue Task Force, employs teams of dogs and handlers, deployed to emergency and disaster sites.
- National Disaster Search Dog Foundation (SDF) recruits and trains rescued dogs to be rescuers, partnering them with first responders throughout North America. SDF-trained teams go on to serve in disaster search, accounting for approximately one quarter of the FEMA Urban Search and Rescue system's canines, as well as placements in wilderness search, avalanche search, and other odor detection careers.
- Special Tasks and Rescue Dog Operations Unit supports the South Australia Police with tracking, searching, and finding lost persons.
- Canada Search Dog Association is a non-profit volunteer run organization of handlers and canines who conduct local searches and conduct public education events.

=== Cadaver dogs ===
Numerous volunteer organizations in cities, countries, and regions across the world specialize in cadaver dog searches. A few notable ones include:

- OSARVA - Non-profit, volunteer organization that supports search and rescue teams in Ontario, Canada, and works closely with the Ontario Provincial Police
- Canadian Search Dogs Association - Non-profit organization that trains dogs for search and rescue, and educates the public
- Human Remains Detection Dog INTERNATIONAL sets international standards for the use of human remains detection dogs in searching for human remains.

== Notable dogs ==
- Beauty, a Wirehaired Terrier, was a search and rescue dog during the Second World War in England.
- Frida (2009–2022) was a yellow Labrador Retriever and a search and rescue dog for the Mexican Navy (SEMAR).
- Jake, a Labrador Retriever, was a search and rescue dog that worked the disasters of the September 11 attacks (2001) and Hurricane Katrina (2005).
- Orion, a Rottweiler, helped save the lives of at least 37 people in 1999 from drowning during flash floods in Vargas, Venezuela.
- Rex, entered burning buildings to find trapped people during the Second World War in England.
- Mancs, a German Shepherd trained to find people buried by earthquakes.
- Anonymous Newfoundland that learned to push children into the Seine in 1908 so he could earn a beefsteak reward by then rescuing them.

=== Notable cadaver dogs ===
- Pearl, a yellow Labrador, and her handler Jim Suffolk of the New York State Police, were the first recorded instance of a search and rescue team consisting of a dog exclusively trained in the search of cadavers.
- Buster, a black Labrador retriever dubbed "Sherlock Bones" and the "Wonder Dog", is known for aiding in the discovery of new evidence in the Black Dahlia case.

== In fiction ==
- The television series PAW Patrol focuses on a team of SAR dogs, with each dog representing a different occupation.

== See also ==
- Nosework – Dog sport
- Working dog – Dog trained to perform practical tasks
- Mounted search and rescue – Specialty within search and rescue
- International Rescue Dog Organisation
- National Disaster Search Dog Foundation
