= Ana (dog) =

Search and rescue dog (1995–2008)

Ana (July 4, 1995 – November 12, 2008) was a Golden Retriever search and rescue dog, known for having been the first graduate of the National Disaster Search Dog Foundation's training program. Ana was one of the first search dogs to be deployed to the site of the World Trade Center following the September 11 attacks.

President George W. Bush greets search-and-rescue dogs Ana and Dusty during the World Trade Center response in September 2001.

Ana was born to a backyard breeder, and proved to be too active to work as an assistance dog. Bonnie Bergin, the Executive Director of the Assistance Dog Institute, decided that Ana might be better suited as a search and rescue dog, and suggested her to Wilma Melville, the head of the Search Dog Foundation. Ana was trained at a kennel in Gilroy, California, and, upon graduation, she was the first nationally certified Fire Department Disaster Search Canine and the first dog certified by the Search Dog Foundation.

Ana was assigned to the Sacramento, California Fire Department, where she was paired with fire captain Rick Lee.

Besides the World Trade Center search, Ana and Captain Lee were involved in several other searches, including the sites of collapsed buildings in Sacramento, and the aftermath of Hurricane Katrina.

She was featured on a report on Animal Planet, and on the National Geographic Channel's Dogs with Jobs.

Ana died of cancer in Captain Lee's arms.

== See also ==
- List of individual dogs
