= Stromal cell-derived factor =

Stromal cell-derived factor may refer to:

- Stromal cell-derived factor 1 (SDF-1, SDF1, Sdf1)
- Stromal cell-derived factor 4 (SDF-4, SDF4, Sdf4)
