= National Disaster Search Dog Foundation =

Organization to train rescue dogs

The National Disaster Search Dog Foundation (SDF) is a nonprofit organization in the United States that recruits and trains rescue dogs. It was established in 1996 by Wilma Melville. As of 2024, there are 94 search teams trained by SDF that can be deployed regionally and nationally.

== Founding ==
Wilma Melville, a retired schoolteacher and canine search specialist, and her FEMA-certified dog, Murphy, searched for survivors in the aftermath of the Oklahoma City bombing and noticed that few search dogs were on-site. After learning that there were only 15 canine-human search teams certified in the country, she established the National Disaster Search Dog Foundation. Melville set a goal of training 168 teams, one for each person who died in the attack on Oklahoma City, which she achieved in 2020. By 2023, SDF had trained and certified more than 229 teams.

SDF received a $150,000 grant from the PETCO Foundation in 2002, a $30,000 grant in 2003, and a $12,500 grant from AT&T in 2005. In 2007, Melville received a $100,000 Purpose Prize, awarded by San Francisco's Civic Venture for "people over 60 who have made important social innovations", for her work with the SDF. The SDF does not accept government funding.

== Recruitment and training ==
SDF accepts rescue dogs and donated dogs. SDF commits to taking care of its dogs for life, and finds appropriate homes for those that are unable to complete the training program. SDF pays for the training, both for the dogs and the handlers. Most dogs are paired with firefighters and the dogs are donated to the fire departments. In 2003, the SDF provided four trained search dogs to the United States Capitol Police K-9 unit.

The program looks for dogs that have high levels of energy and drive, traits that might make a dog difficult to place in a home but ideal for search training. The dogs undergo six to eight months of training, starting with learning to bark when they encounter live human scent. The training proceeds through searching, obedience, and navigating an obstacle course. Their potential human partners are trained first with a dog that is already certified, then paired with a trainee dog. Canine-human teams usually achieve their FEMA certification in about a year. The initial efforts of the National Disaster Search Dog Foundation were focused on the recovery of living survivors. In the 2020s, it began to include training for recovery of deceased victims.

Since the establishment of SDF, the rate at which dogs become FEMA certified has risen from 15 percent to 85 percent. Training a dog and handler team, which takes 10 to 12 months, costs approximately $75,000.

== National Training Center ==
SDF is based near Santa Paula, California. The training center covers 145 acres and contains multiple settings that simulate disaster environments. Army reservists and Navy Seabees volunteered to construct structures for the training center, buildings that appear to have suffered a disaster but that are still structurally sound for training safety. The military paid for construction labor and some of the equipment.

== Operations ==
Teams trained by SDF have searched for survivors after numerous disasters, including:

- September 11 attacks
- Hurricane Katrina
- 2011 Tōhoku earthquake and tsunami
- 2018 Southern California mudflows
- 2023 Turkey–Syria earthquakes
- 2023 Hawaii wildfires
- January 2025 Southern California wildfires
- July 2025 Central Texas floods

== See also ==
- Ana, the first dog to graduate SDF's training program
