= International Search and Rescue Dog Organisation =

- Abbreviation: IRO
- Formation: 1993
- Purpose: Search and rescue dog work
- Headquarters: Salzburg
- Location: Salzburg, Austria
- Region served: worldwide
- Members: 140
- Website: https://www.iro-dogs.org/en/

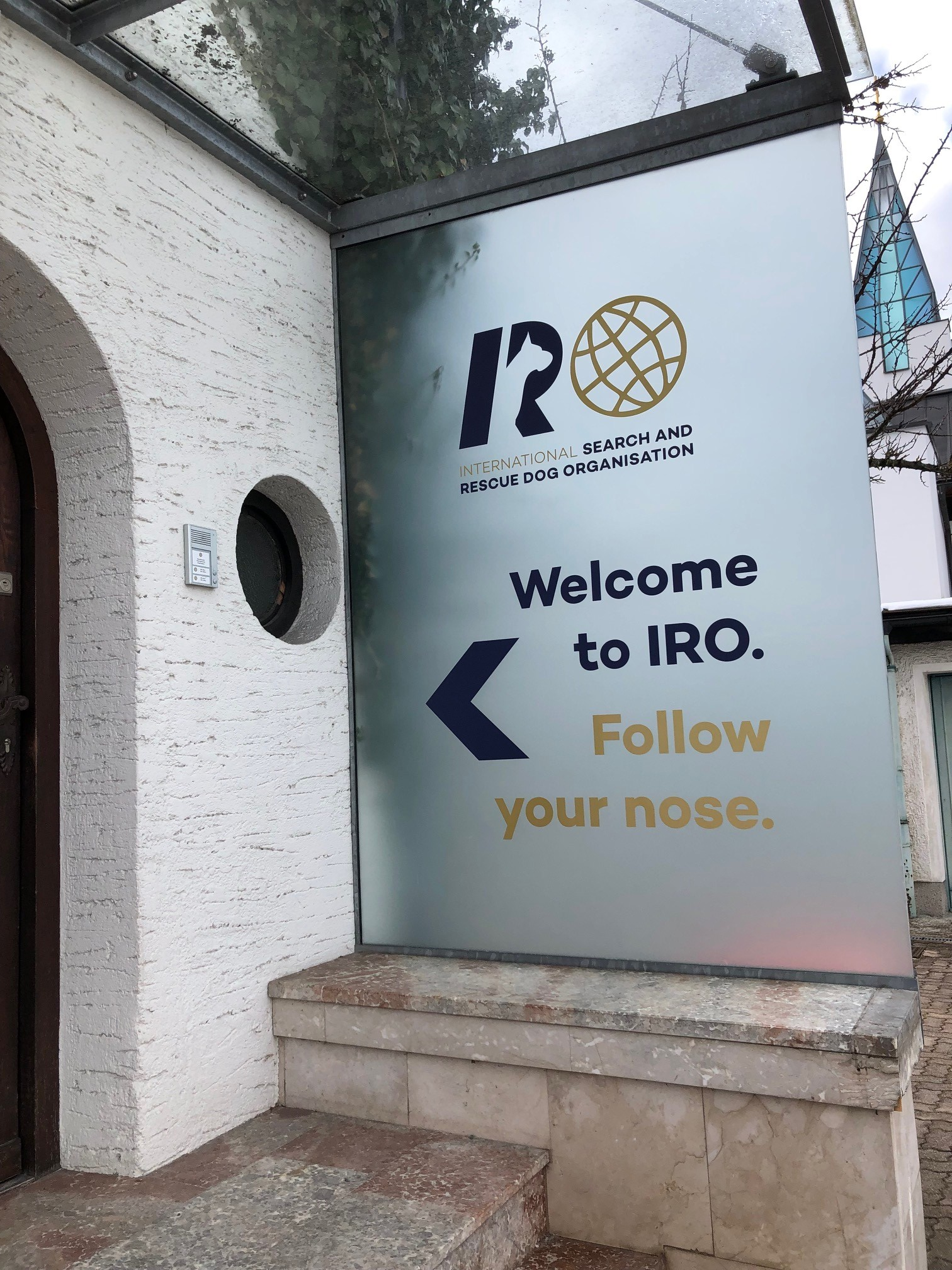
IRO Office, Salzburg, Austria

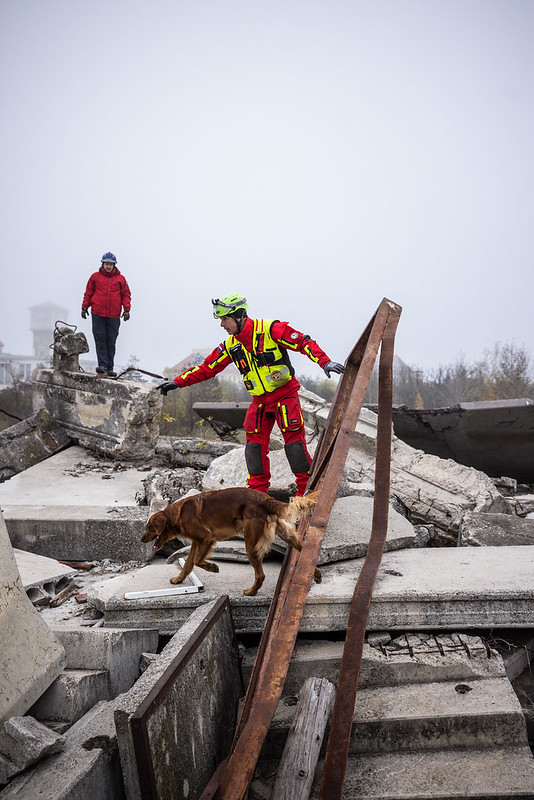
International Mission Readiness Test in Rubble Search

The International Search and Rescue Dog Organisation (IRO) is the worldwide umbrella organisation for search and rescue dog work and partner of the UN organisation INSARAG. It unites more than 250,000 people worldwide with about 4,000 certified search and rescue (SAR) dogs. The headquarters are in Salzburg.

The task of the International Search and Rescue Dog Organisation is to train and certify highly qualified search and rescue dog teams and to provide them as supporting units in case of emergency. Thanks to their fine noses, dogs often become lifesavers after an avalanche accident, an earthquake or in the search for missing children and disoriented people suffering from Alzheimer's or Dementia. Response teams from IRO member organisations are ready to respond 365 days a year when disaster strikes.

The International Search and Rescue Dog Organisation was founded in 1993 and is a registered non-profit organisation. As such, it relies upon donations to provide search and rescue dog teams with the certification, training and education necessary to find lost and missing people.

== Competence ==
With their extremely fine sense of smell, dogs are indispensable in search operations, because in contrast to humans, dogs have about 40 times the number of olfactory cells. Therefore, search and rescue dogs can locate the position of buried or missing persons with great accuracy. Despite the rapid technical development, search and rescue dogs are still far superior to any search technology. The four-legged lifesavers are particularly characterised by their flexibility, agility on difficult terrain and incredible search drive.

== Training ==
The training of search and rescue dogs often starts at the age of eight weeks. Courses, trainings and testing events prepare the canines step by step for the case of emergency. IRO trains search and rescue dogs in the disciplines of Tracking, Area Search, Rubble Search and Avalanche Search as well as Water Rescue and Mantrailing.

The first test (V-test) evaluates among other things dexterity and nerve strength. Thereupon the search and rescue dog teams can take the A- and B-tests.

Facts & figures

- Active IRO certified search and rescue dogs: ~ 4,000
- Deployments since 1993: 38,392
- Average training period: 2 – 3 years
- Amount of money required for training a search and rescue dog: ~ 20,000 Euros

== Deployment ==
A positive B test allows for a participation at the MRT (Mission Readiness Test). Annually, the IRO holds at least one MRT in the discipline Area Search as well as Rubble Search. Teams with a positive result are well prepared for a disaster mission. The establishment of national search and rescue dog capacities, especially in disaster-prone countries, is essential for the IRO. At the same time, international cooperation is becoming increasingly important, in order to coordinate search and rescue dog teams efficiently when major disasters occur.

Missions of IRO search and rescue dogs

Response teams from IRO member organisations are ready to respond 365 days a year when disaster strikes, on a voluntary basis and in all weathers. Below are three missions involving IRO search and rescue dog teams.

- Earthquake in Turkey and Syria

In the early hours of 6 February 2023, a 7.8 magnitude earthquake caused catastrophic damage in south-eastern Turkey and parts of Syria. Several IRO member organisations sent almost 100 search and rescue dogs with their handlers to the quake zone in Turkey within a very short time. The teams spent day and night searching the ruins for survivors. Regardless of stress, freezing cold and the danger of collapsing building structures, the canines did not let themselves be diverted from their mission. Thanks to their courageous and determined efforts, they saved the lives of numerous people.

- Missing boy from Stopice

On 9 May 2018 a message was received, which stated that a 13-year-old boy of the small village Stopice went missing. Dog handlers of the IRO member organisation ERPS were immediately called in and started their search after a short briefing at the deployment site and the lay out of the search strategy. Six search and rescue dog teams of the discipline Area and one Mantrailing team were deployed. Only after 25 minutes searching, the boy could be located by a search dog behind a chapel. Subsequently, the parents were informed and the boy was brought home safely.

- Severe earthquake in Mexico City and surroundings

Exactly on the same day as the remembrance of the earthquake of 1985 took place, the earth shook again. On 19 September 2017 at 13:14 local time the shaking started. The IRO member organisation PMPBR-UNAM searched nine different buildings, among them a school, with their search and rescue dogs. Altogether, 35 to 40 buildings were searched by rescue teams. Since it has been an earthquake of a greater extent, Canadian and Argentine IRO teams were called in towards the end of the mission too.

== Member organisations ==
Since its foundation in 1993, the International Search and Rescue Dog Organisation has developed continuously and currently counts 140 national search and rescue dog organisations from 44 nations worldwide. In Austria alone there are ten organisations.

Countries
Argentina
Australia
Austria
Belgium
Brazil
Bulgaria
Canada
Chile
China
Colombia
Croatia
Czech Republic
Denmark
Estonia
Finland
France
Germany
Greece
Hungary
Italy
Japan
Malaysia
Malta
Mexico
Netherlands
Norway
Poland
Romania
Russia
Serbia
Singapore
Slovakia
Slovenia
Spain
South Korea
Sweden
Switzerland
Taiwan
Thailand
Turkey
Ukraine
Uruguay
United Kingdom
United States

== Events ==
IRO organises courses, trainings, testing events, mission readiness tests, competitions and the annual World Championship for search and rescue dogs. Up to 150 SAR dog teams demonstrate their skills in Tracking, Area Search and Rubble Search at the World Championship. 2018 also saw the first World Championship in the discipline of Avalanche Search. Much effort is put into recreating real-life scenarios, which the best of the best impressively master.

WCHs in recent years
Year	Venue
2025	Rapšach, Czech Republic
2024	Vantaa, Finland
2023	Stubenberg, Austria
2022	Craiova, Romania
2022	Pitztal, Austria – Avalanche
2019	Paris, France
2018	Ljubljana, Slovenia
2018	Pitztal, Austria – Avalanche
2017	Ebreichsdorf, Austria
2016	Turin, Italy
2015	Aalborg, Denmark
2014	Nova Gorica, Slovenia
2013	Nijmegen, Netherlands
2012	Romny, Ukraine
2011	Chastre, Belgium
2010	Žatec, Czech Republic

In 2008, the IRO also launched the International Search and Rescue Dog Day, an initiative that offers search and rescue dog organisations the opportunity to present themselves and at the same time give an insight into the valuable work with search and rescue dogs. According to the motto "365 days a year mission ready", demonstrations, information events and trial trainings are organised all over the world.

== Organisational structure ==
The International Search and Rescue Dog Organisation is based in Salzburg, Austria and currently employs six people. The highest decision-making body of the IRO is the Meeting of Delegates. It is composed of the delegates from the respective national search and rescue dog organisations, the executive board and the executive committee.

== History ==
The Spitak earthquake in Armenia in 1988 raised the question of international cooperation in the field of search and rescue dog training. As one of the most severe earthquakes in recent decades, it gave the impulse to strive for better coordination between disaster relief workers, search and rescue dog teams and authorities. As a result, the IRO was founded in 1993 with the aim of setting standards for the training and deployment of search and rescue dog teams worldwide. Since the beginning, the IRO has been working together with the UN to continuously develop and improve SAR dog work. Dr Wolfgang Zörner, who chaired the IRO as President from 1993 to 2013, played a key role in the development of the IRO. Under his auspices, the IRO became internationally recognised and a uniform global standard for the training of search and rescue dogs was introduced.
