= International Search and Rescue Advisory Group =

UN OCHA advisory group

INSARAG
- International Search and Rescue Advisory Group

Agency overview
- Agency executive: Sebastian Rhodes Stampa, Secretary of INSARAG
- Parent agency: UNOCHA
- Website: www.insarag.org

The International Search and Rescue Advisory Group (INSARAG) is a United Nations advisory body established in 1991 focused on Urban Search and Rescue (USAR). It develops standards, classifications, and methodologies for international coordination in the aftermath of earthquakes and structural collapses. The INSARAG Secretariat is located in the United Nations Office for the Coordination of Humanitarian Affairs (OCHA) at the Palais des Nations in Geneva, Switzerland.

== History ==
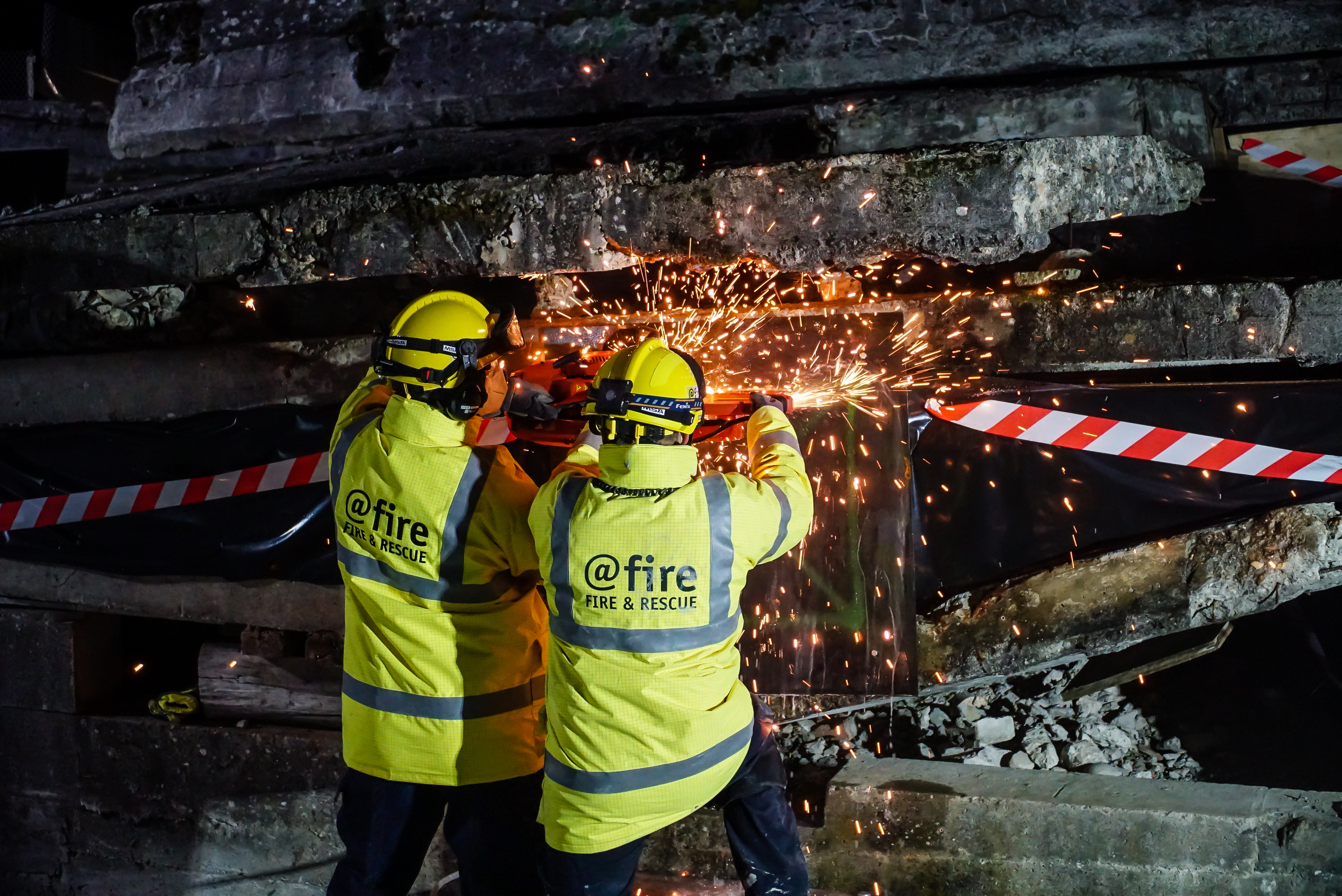
German aid organization "@fire" classified by INSARAG as the world's first "USAR Light" earthquake rescue team

INSARAG was established in 1991 in response to intense earthquake disasters, including the 1985 Mexico City earthquake and the 1988 Spitak earthquake in Armenia.

In 2002, the United Nations General Assembly endorsed INSARAG’s role through Resolution 57/150, which called for "strengthening the effectiveness and coordination of international USAR assistance". In 2010, participants at the Global Meeting in Kobe, Japan adopted the Hyogo Framework for Action. This was a ten-year program for disaster risk reduction which concluded in March 2015.

INSARAG has been involved in the coordination of international teams during several emergencies, such as the 2010 Haiti earthquake, the 2015 Nepal earthquake, and the 2023 Turkey–Syria earthquake.

== Mandates ==
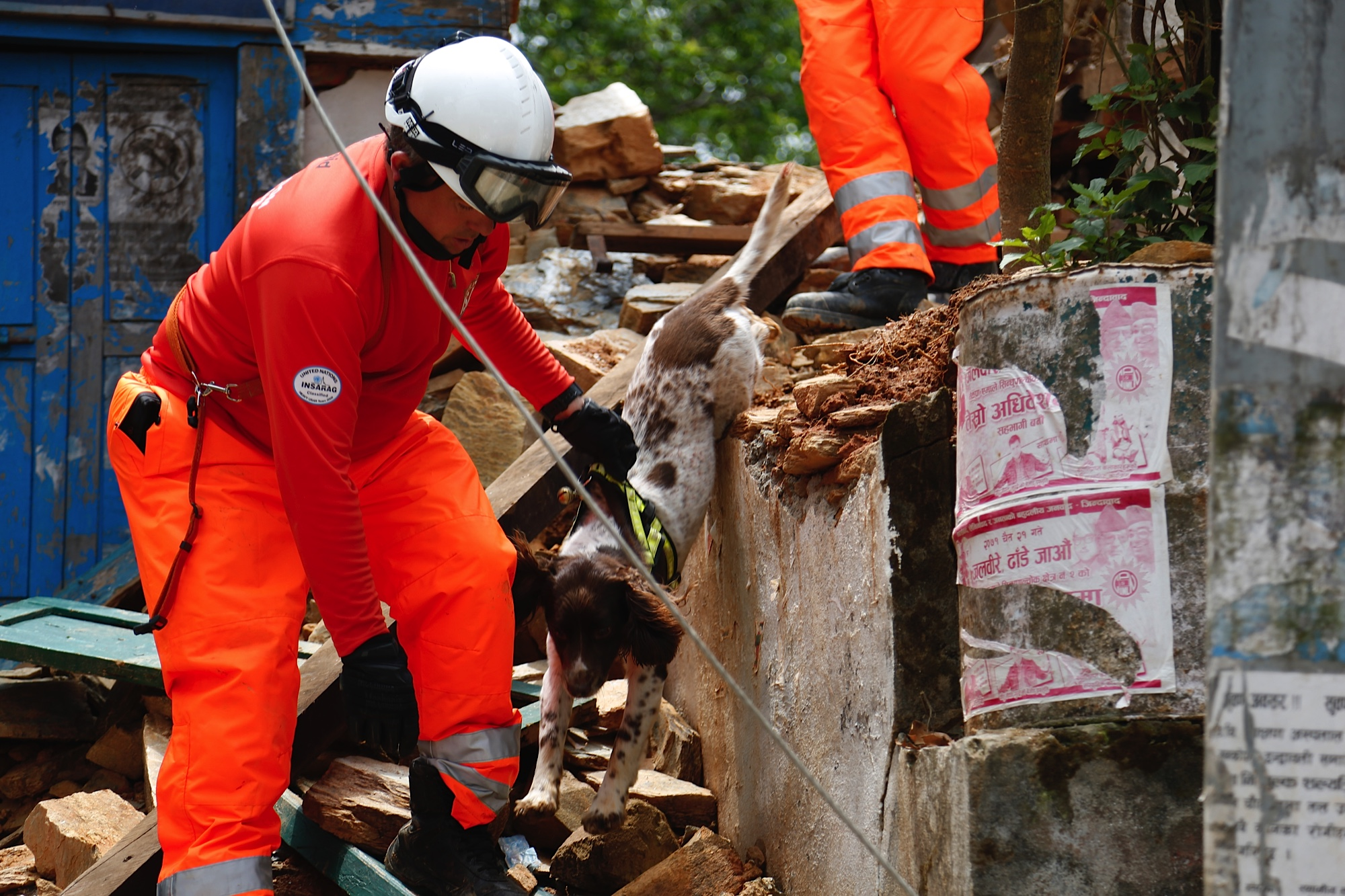
Gary Carroll and his dog Diesel from the UK's International Search and Rescue team in Chautara, April 2015

The INSARAG mandates mention:

- Developing international USAR procedures and operational standards.
- Implementing the "Strengthening the Effectiveness" document.
- Improving cooperation and coordination among international USAR teams at disaster sites.
- Promoting USAR preparedness activities in disaster-prone countries.
- Developing standardized guidelines and procedures.
- Sharing best practices among national and international USAR teams.
- Defining minimum requirements for international USAR teams.

== Membership ==
Membership in INSARAG is generally open to any country or organization involved in USAR. Prospective members must designate a national focal point to liaise with the INSARAG Regional Group and Secretariat. Organizations apply through their national focal point. Although not required for membership, countries with internationally deployable USAR teams are encouraged to obtain INSARAG External Classification (IEC).

Members participate in regional meetings and contribute to INSARAG working groups. They may also have access to the Virtual On-Site Operations Coordination Centre (OSOCC) and the Global Disaster Alert and Coordination System (GDACS) for real-time alerts and coordination tools. The INSARAG Secretariat maintains the USAR Directory, listing member countries and their USAR teams.

== Leadership ==
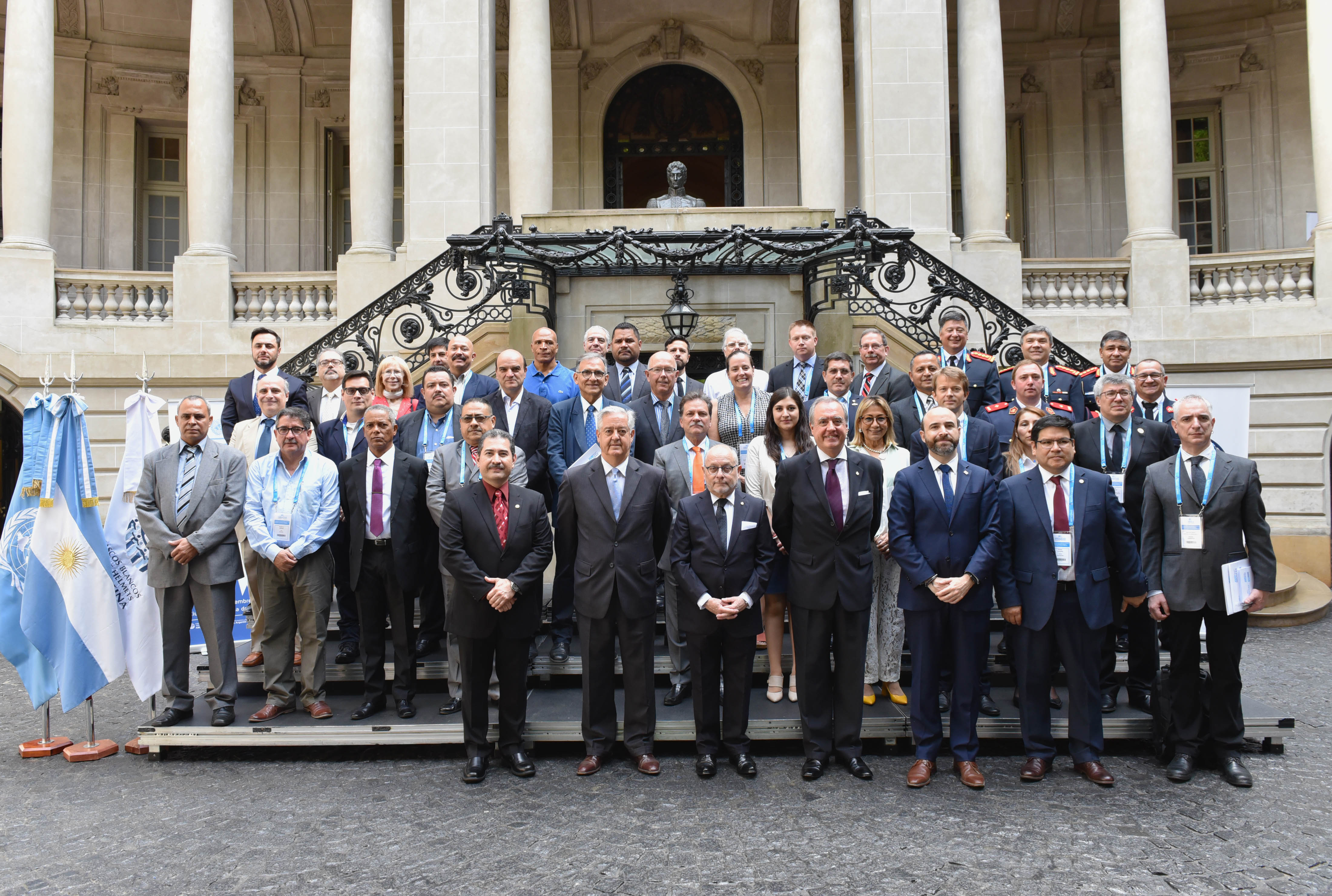
INSARAG members convening in Argentina, November 2019

In February 2023, INSARAG leadership comprised a secretary and regional Sub-Secretaries:

- Sebastian Rhodes Stampa, Secretary of INSARAG
- Haruka Ezaki, Sub-Secretary for Asia-Pacific
- Lucien Jaggi, Sub-Secretary for Middle East and North Africa
- Clement Kalonga, Sub-Secretary for Africa
- Ana Maria Rebaza, Sub-Secretary for the Americas
- Stefania Trassari, Sub-Secretary for Europe and the CIS
